= Turin =

City in Piedmont, Italy

Turin Torino (Italian)
- Comune
- Città di Torino
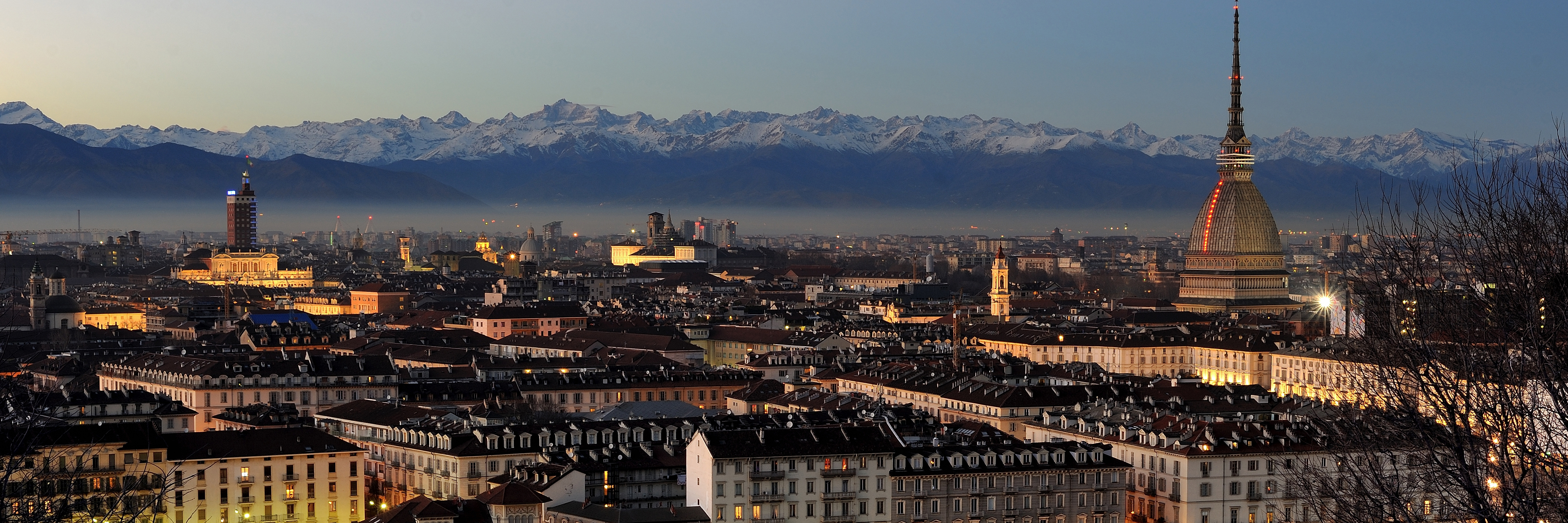
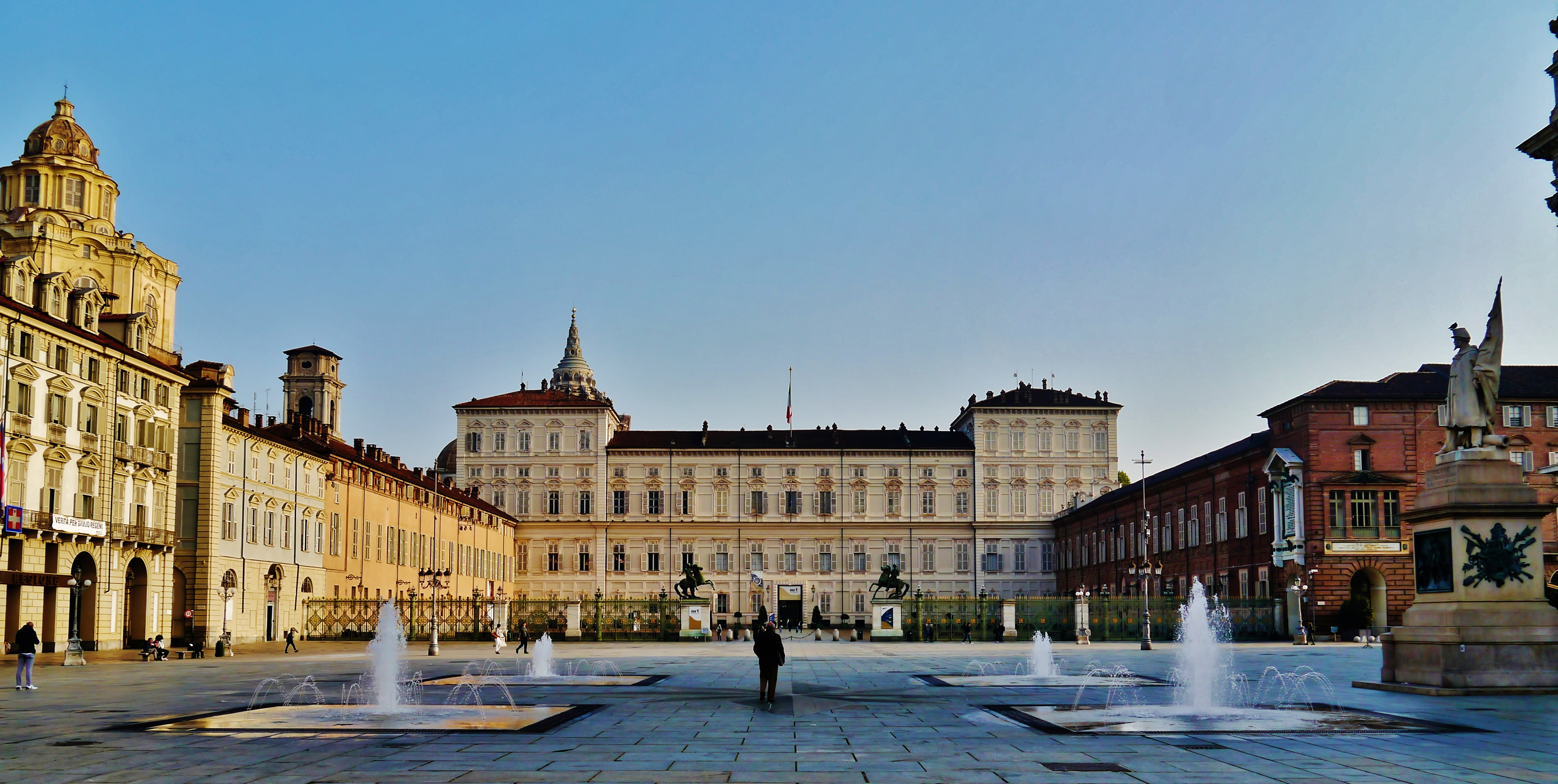
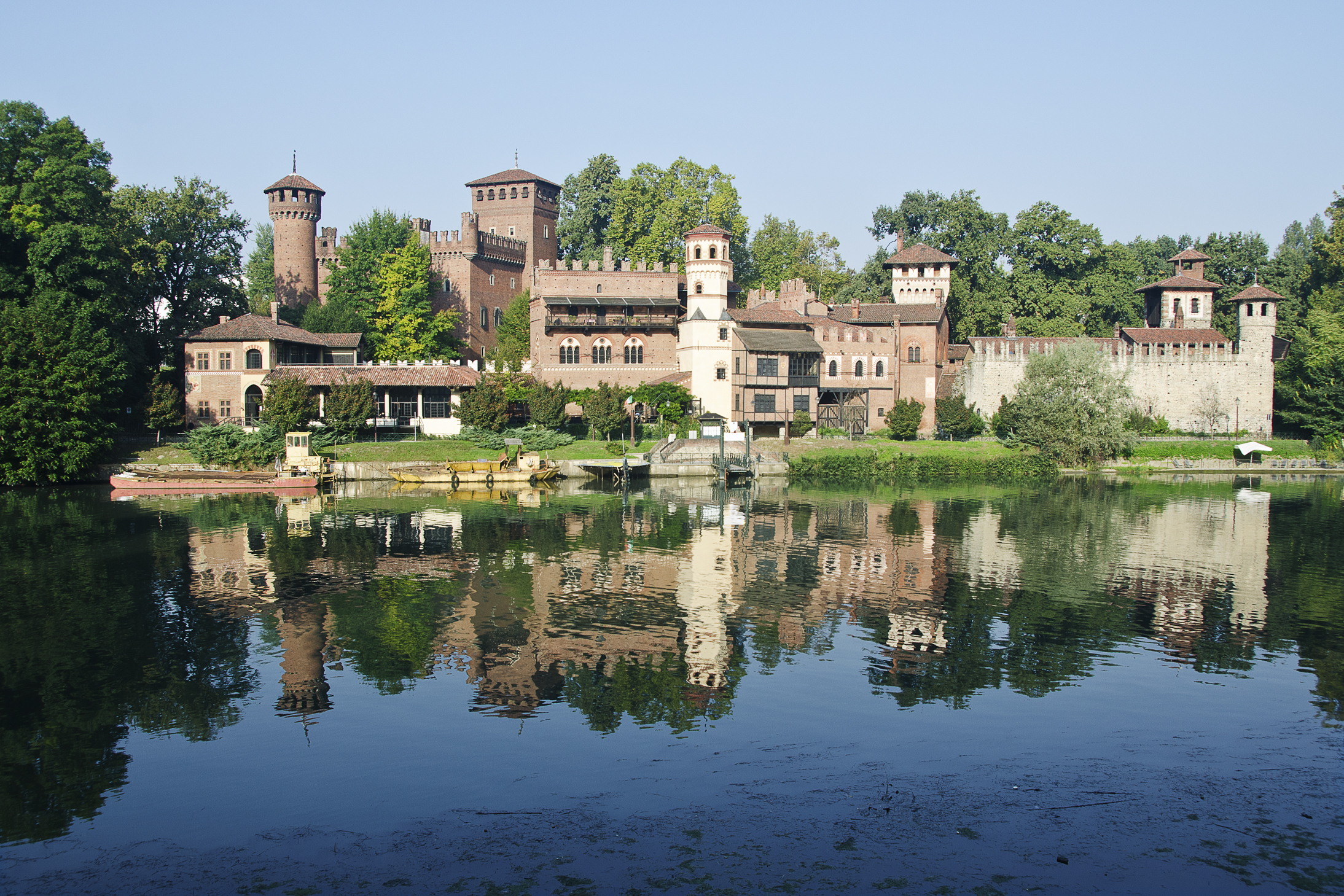
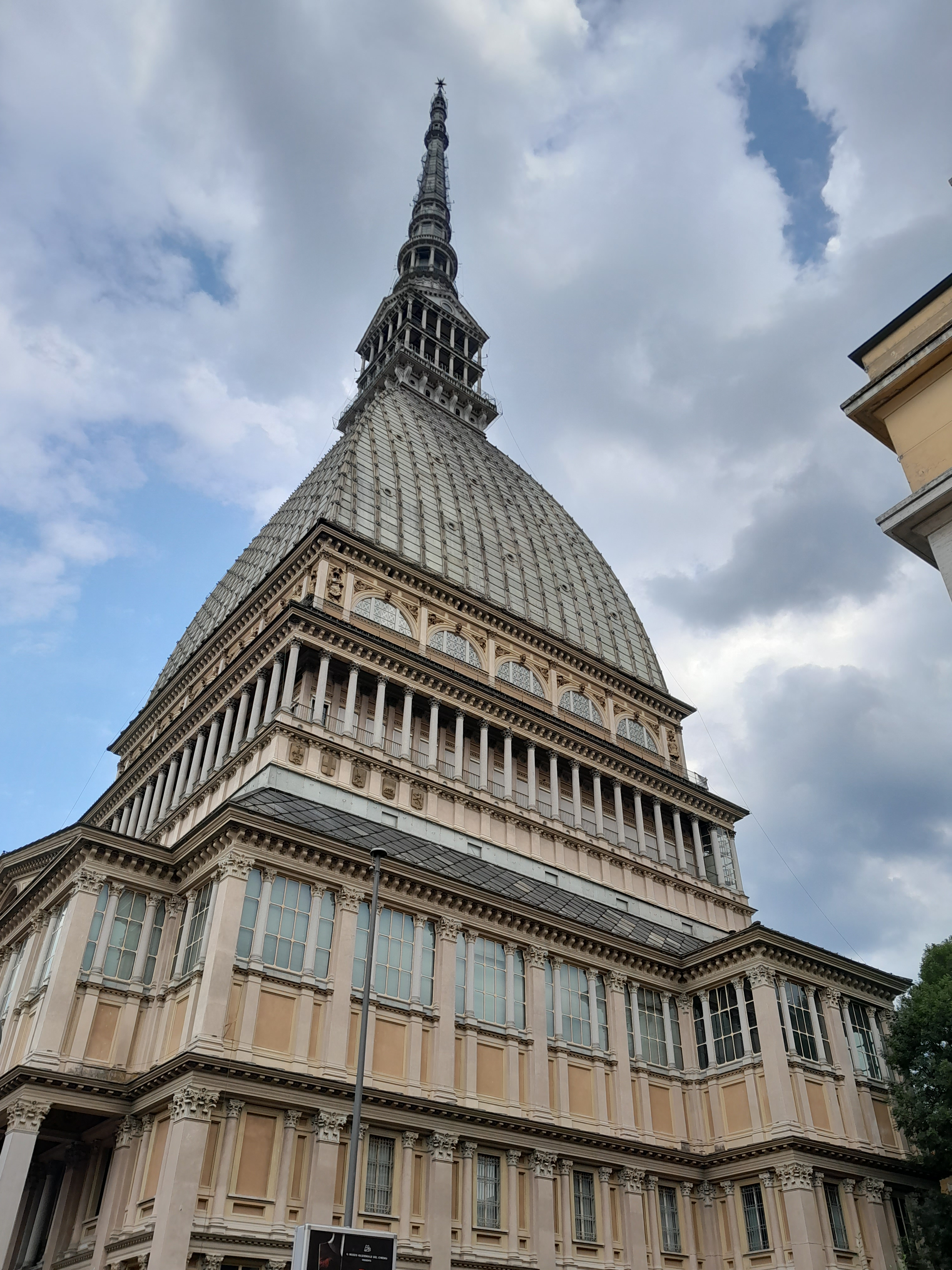
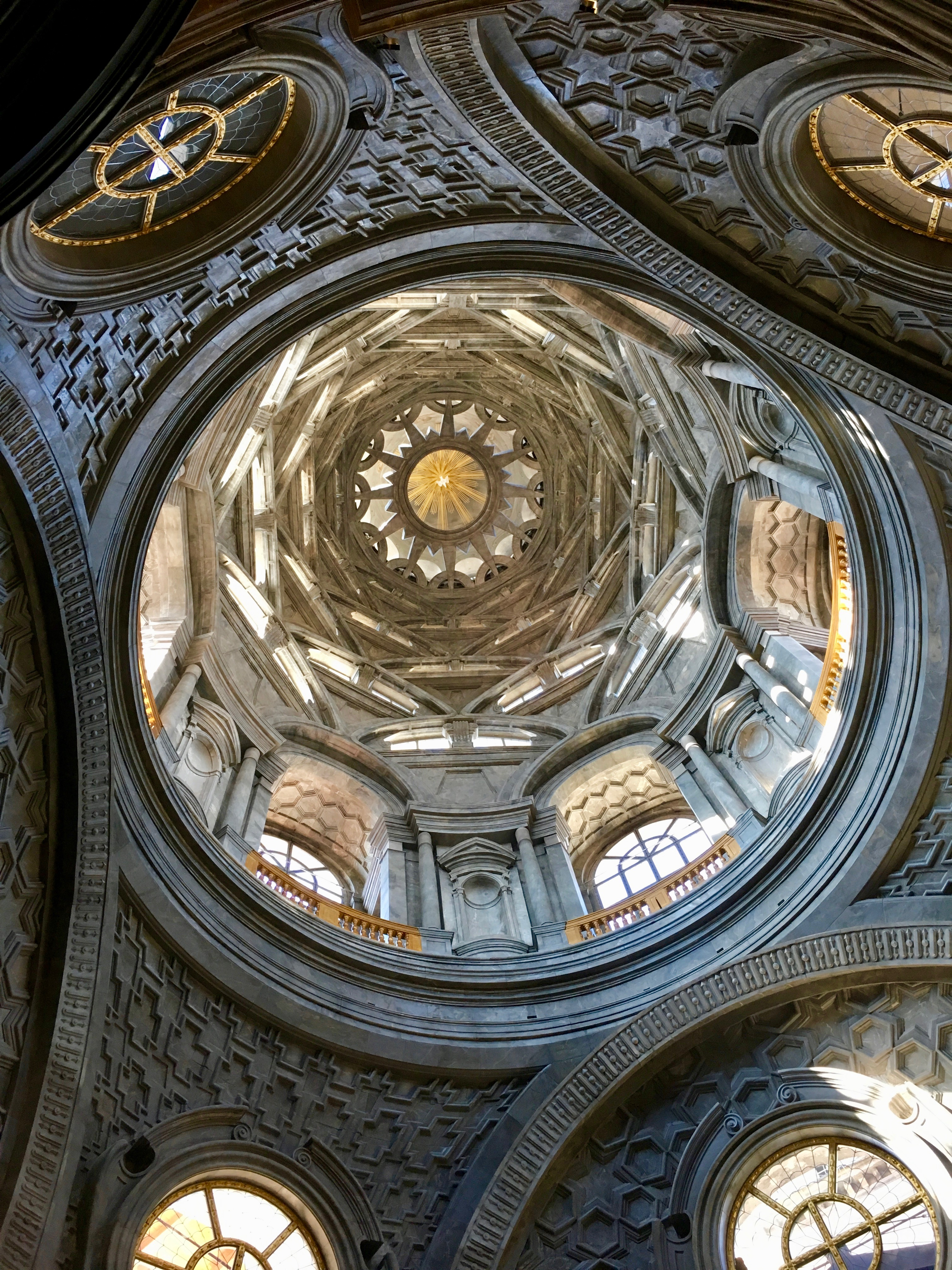
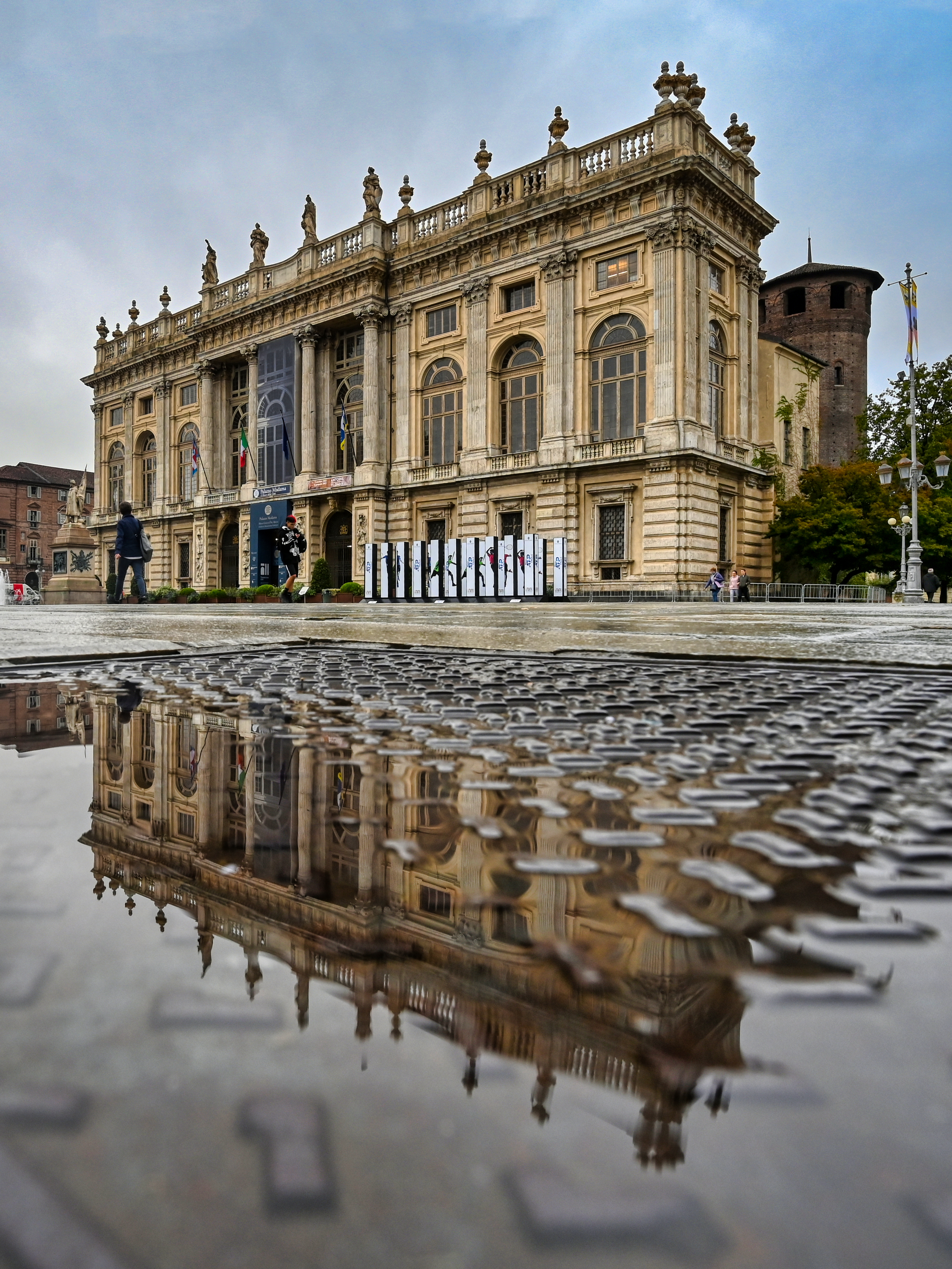
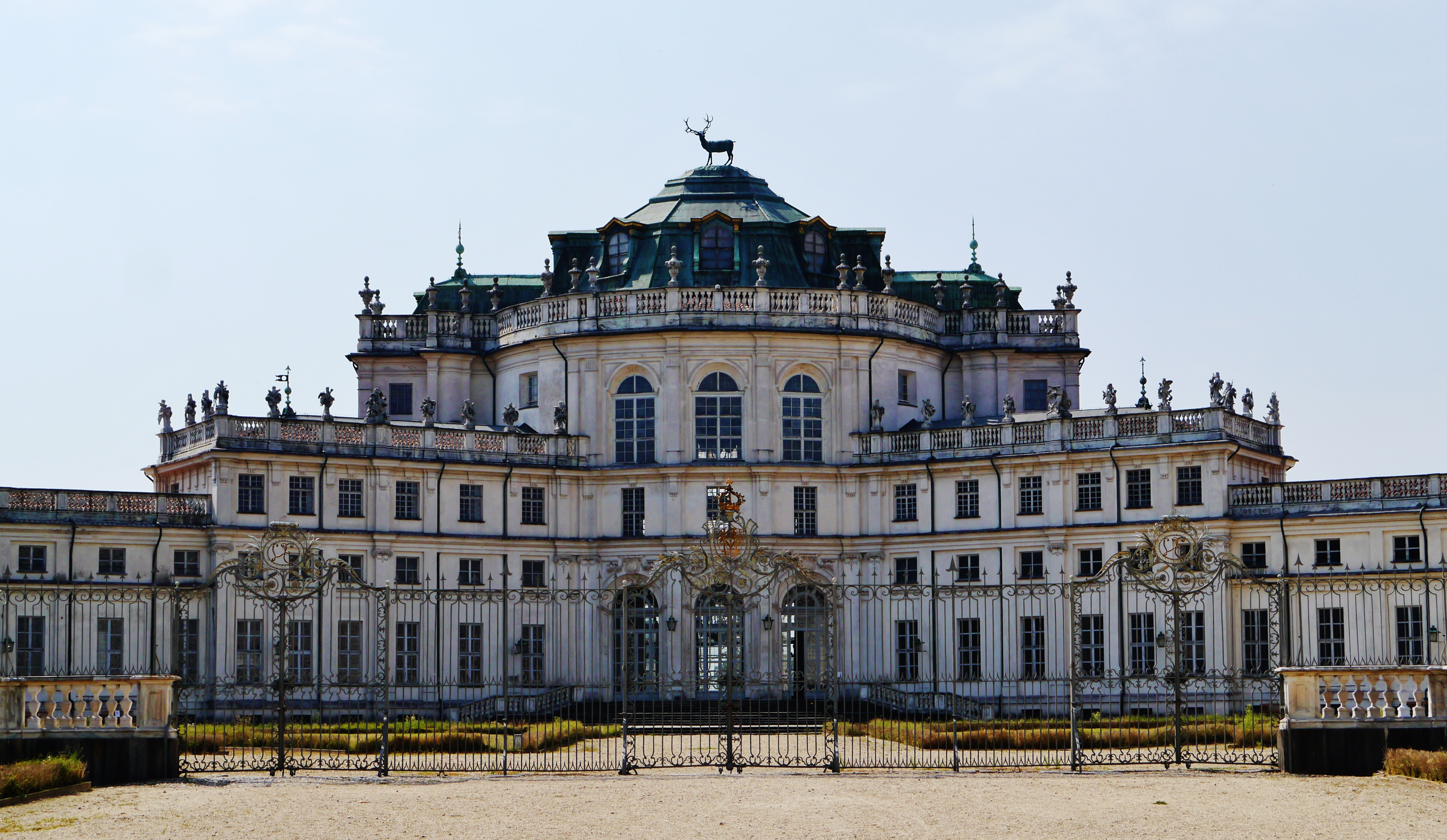
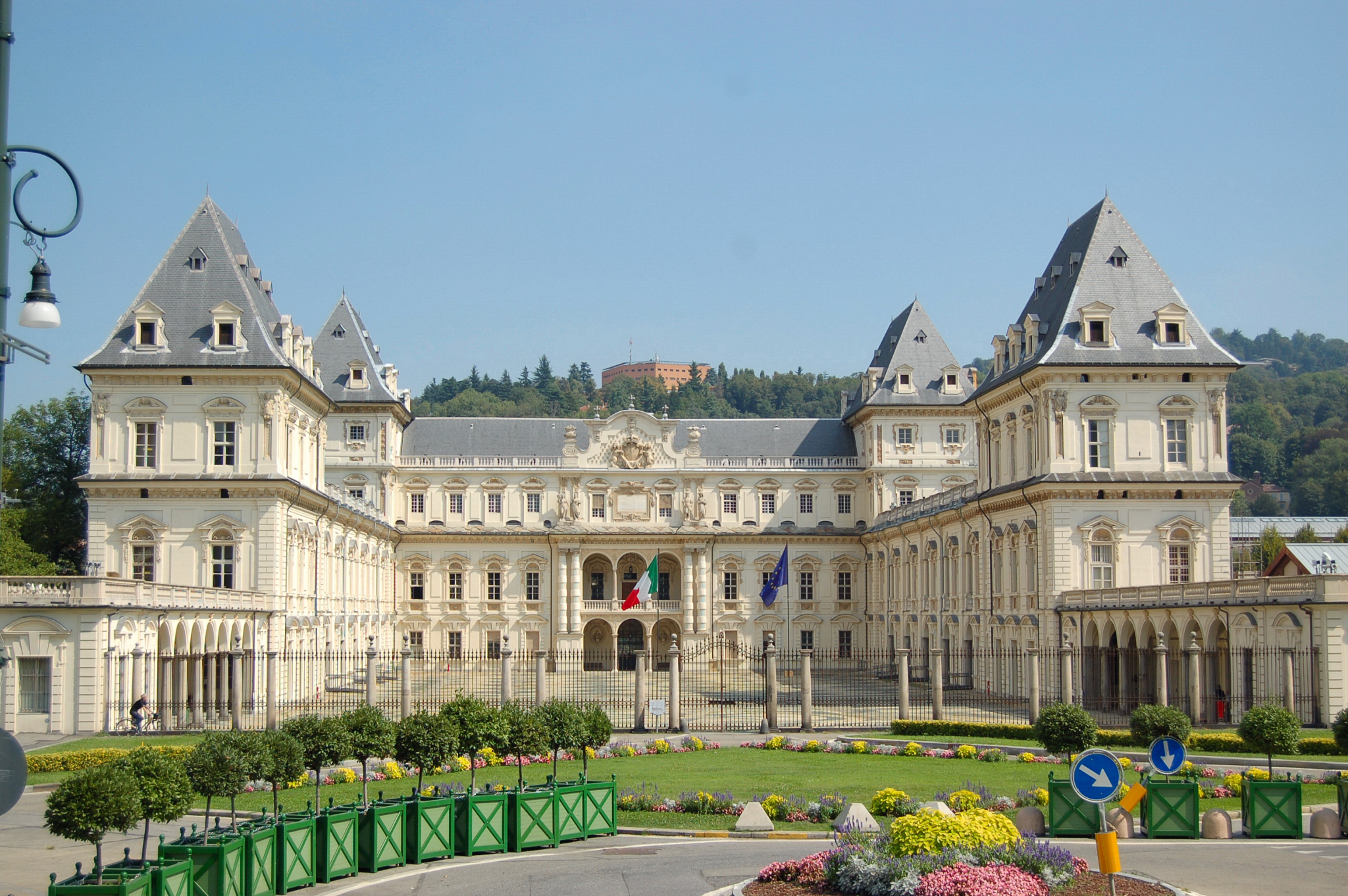
- Skyline of Turin Royal Palace of Turin Borgo Medioevale Mole Antonelliana Chapel of the Holy Shroud Palazzo Madama Palazzina di caccia of Stupinigi Castello del Valentino

- Flag Coat of arms
- Nicknames: Città sabauda (Savoyard City); Capitale delle Alpi (Capital of the Alps); Città magica (Magic City)
- Motto(s): Auxilium meum a Domino (Latin) ("My help comes from the Lord")
- Interactive map of Turin
- Location within Piedmont Location within Italy Location within Europe
- Coordinates: 45°04′45″N 07°40′34″E
- Country: Italy
- Region: Piedmont
- Metropolitan city: Turin (TO)

Government
  - Mayor: Stefano Lo Russo (PD)

Area
  - Total: 130.01 km^{2} (50.20 sq mi)
- Elevation: 239 m (784 ft)

Population (2026)
  - Total: 855,654 (4th)
  - Density: 6,581.4/km^{2} (17,046/sq mi)
- Demonym: Turinese(s)
- Time zone: UTC+1 (CET)
  - Summer (DST): UTC+2 (CEST)
- Postal code: 10121-10156
- Dialing code: 0039 011
- ISTAT code: 001272
- Patron saint: John the Baptist
- Saint day: 24 June
- Website: comune.torino.it

UNESCO World Heritage Site
- Official name: Residences of the Royal House of Savoy
- Includes: several locations in Turin
- Criteria: Cultural: (i)(ii)(iv)(v)
- Reference: 823bis
- Inscription: 1997 (21st Session)
- Extensions: 2010

Turin (Note: /tjʊəˈrɪn, ˈtjʊərɪn/ ture-IN, TURE-in; Piedmontese: [tyˈriŋ]) (Italian: Torino) (Note: [toˈriːno]; Latin: Augusta Taurinorum, then Taurinum) is a city and a business and cultural centre in northern Italy. It is the capital and largest city of Piedmont and of the Metropolitan City of Turin. From 1861 to 1865, it was the first capital of the Kingdom of Italy. The city is mainly on the western bank of the River Po, below its Susa Valley, and is surrounded by the western Alpine arch and Superga hill. The population of the city proper is 855,654 as of 2026, while the population of the urban area is estimated by Eurostat to be 1.7 million inhabitants. The Turin metropolitan area is estimated by the OECD to have a population of 2.2 million.

The city was historically a major European political centre. From 1563, it was the capital of the Duchy of Savoy, then of the Kingdom of Sardinia ruled by the House of Savoy, and then the first capital of the Kingdom of Italy from 1861 to 1865. Turin is sometimes called "the cradle of Italian liberty" for having been the political and intellectual centre of the Risorgimento that led to the unification of Italy, as well as the birthplace of notable individuals who contributed to it, such as Camillo Benso, Count of Cavour. Although much of its political influence had been lost by World War II, it had become a centre of anti-fascist movements during the Ventennio fascista, including the Italian resistance movement. Postwar Turin became a major European crossroads for industry, commerce and trade, and is part of the industrial triangle, along with Milan and Genoa. In 2004 it ranked third in Italy, after Milan and Rome, for economic strength.

As of 2018, the city has been ranked by GaWC as a Gamma-level global city. Turin is home to much of the Italian automotive industry, and is the base for the headquarters of Fiat, Lancia, and Alfa Romeo.

The city has a rich culture and history, and is known for its numerous art galleries, restaurants, churches, palaces, opera houses, piazzas, parks, gardens, theatres, libraries, museums and other venues. Turin is well known for its Baroque, Rococo, Neoclassical, and Art Nouveau architecture. Many of Turin's public squares, castles, gardens, and elegant palazzi, such as the Palazzo Madama, were built between the 16th and 18th centuries. A part of the historical centre of Turin was inscribed in the World Heritage List under the name Residences of the Royal House of Savoy.

In addition, the city is home to museums, such as the Museo Egizio, and the Mole Antonelliana, the city's architectural symbol, which in turn hosts the National Museum of Cinema. Turin's attractions make it one of the world's top 250 tourist destinations and the tenth-most visited city in Italy in 2008. The city also hosts some of Italy's most important universities, colleges, academies, lycea, and gymnasia, such as the University of Turin, founded in the 15th century, and the Turin Polytechnic. Turin is also famous worldwide for icons such as the Shroud of Turin, the gianduiotto, the automobile brand Fiat, and the association football club Juventus, which competes with its rival Torino in the Derby della Mole, the city's derby. The city was one of the host cities of the 1934 and 1990 FIFA World Cups, and also hosted the 2006 Winter Olympics, the Eurovision Song Contest 2022 and the tennis ATP Finals from 2021 to 2026.

== History ==
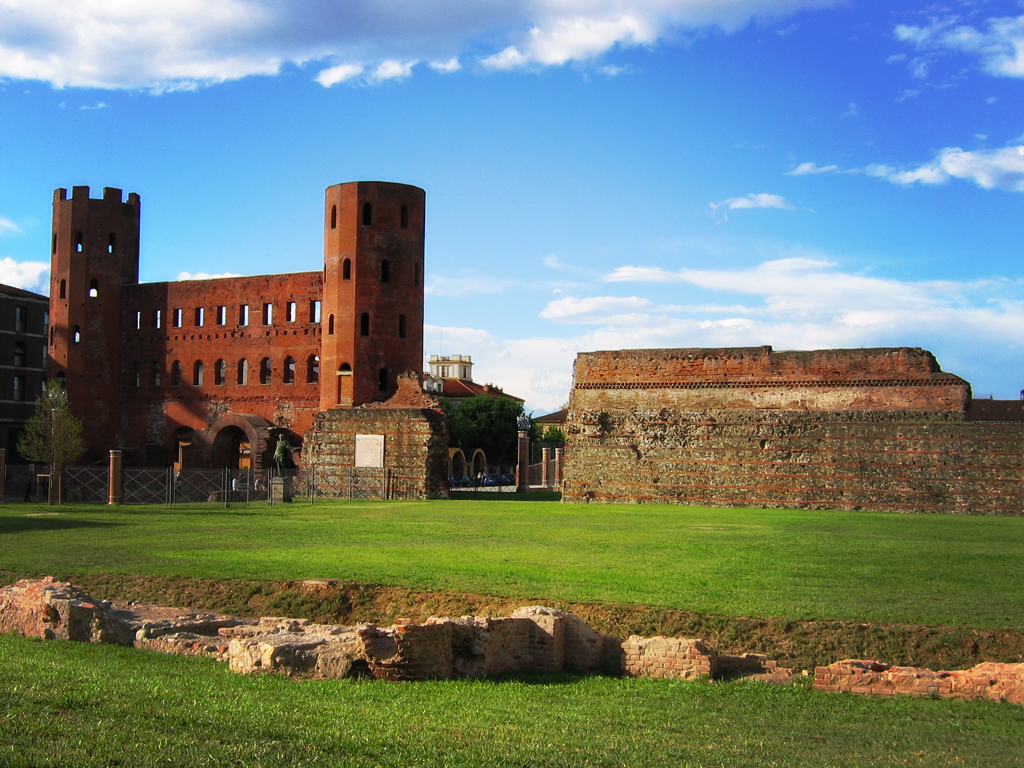
The Roman Palatine Towers

Historical affiliations

Roman Republic 58–27 BC
Roman Empire 27 BC–285 AD
Western Roman Empire 285–476
Kingdom of Odoacer 476–493
Ostrogothic Kingdom 493–553
Eastern Roman Empire 553–569
Lombard Kingdom 569–773
Carolingian Empire 773–888
March of Ivrea 888–941
March of Turin 941–1046
County of Savoy 1046–1416
Duchy of Savoy 1416–1720
Kingdom of Sardinia 1720–1792
French First Republic 1792–1804
First French Empire 1804–1814
Kingdom of Sardinia 1814–1861
Kingdom of Italy 1861–1943
Italian Social Republic 1943–1945
Kingdom of Italy 1945–1946
Italian Republic 1946–present

=== Ancient origins ===
The Taurini were an ancient Celto-Ligurian, Alpine people, who occupied the upper valley of the River Po, in the centre of modern Piedmont. In 218 BC, they were attacked by Hannibal as he was allied with their long-standing enemies, the Insubres. The Taurini chief town (Taurasia) was captured by Hannibal's forces after a three-day siege. As a people they are rarely mentioned in history. It is believed that a Roman colony was established after 28 BC under the name of Julia Augusta Taurinorum (modern Turin). Both Livy and Strabo mention the Taurini's country as including one of the passes of the Alps, which points to a wider use of the name in earlier times.

=== Roman era ===
In the 1st century BC, the Romans founded Augusta Taurinorum. Via Garibaldi traces the exact path of the Roman city's decumanus which began at the Porta Decumani, later incorporated into the Castello or Palazzo Madama. The Porta Palatina, on the north side of the current city centre, is still preserved in a park near the cathedral. Remains of the Roman-period theatre are preserved in the area of the Manica Nuova. Turin reached about 5,000 inhabitants at the time, all living inside the high city walls.

=== Middle Ages ===
After the fall of the Western Roman Empire, the town, along with the rest of the Italian peninsula, was conquered by the Heruli and the Ostrogoths, recaptured by the Romans, but then conquered again by the Lombards whose territory then fell into the hands of the Franks under Charlemagne (773). The Contea di Torino (countship) was founded in the 940s and was held by the Arduinic dynasty until 1050. After the marriage of Adelaide of Susa with Humbert Biancamano's son Otto, the family of the Counts of Savoy gained control. While the title of count was held by the Bishop as count of Turin (1092–1130 and 1136–1191) it was ruled as a prince-bishopric by the Bishops. In 1230–1235, it was a lordship under the Marquess of Montferrat, styled Lord of Turin. At the end of the 13th century, when it was annexed to the Duchy of Savoy, the city already had 20,000 inhabitants. Many of the gardens and palaces were built in the 15th century when the city was redesigned. The University of Turin was also founded during this period.

=== Early modern ===
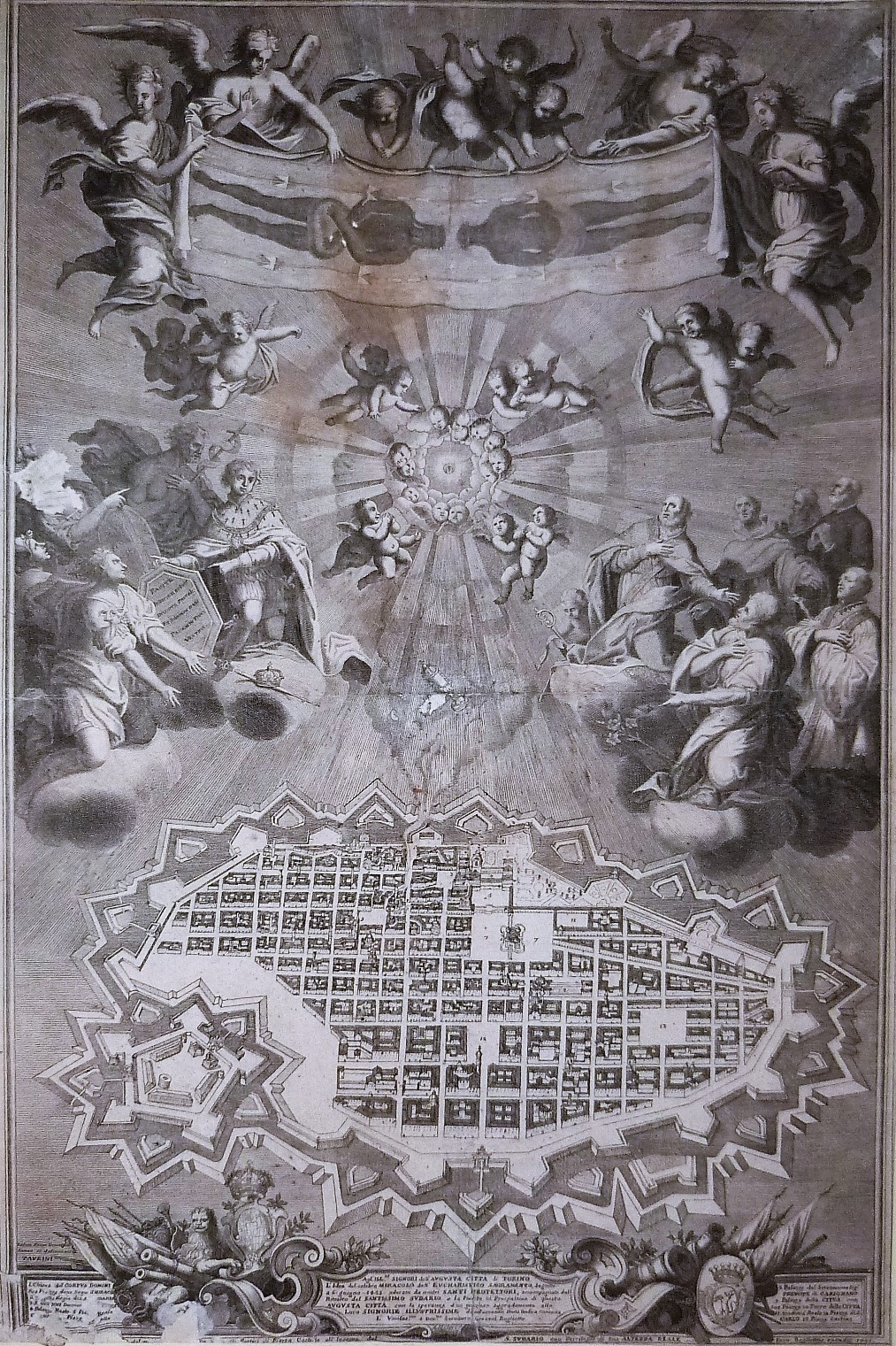
Turin in 1701

Emmanuel Philibert, also known under the nickname of Iron Head (Testa 'd Fer), made Turin the capital of the Duchy of Savoy in 1563. Piazza Reale (named Piazza San Carlo today) and Via Nuova (current Via Roma) were added along with the first enlargement of the walls, in the first half of the 17th century; in the same period the Palazzo Reale (Royal Palace of Turin) was also built. In the second half of that century, a second enlargement of the walls was planned and executed, with the building of the arcaded Via Po, connecting Piazza Castello with the bridge on the Po through the regular street grid.

In 1706, during the Battle of Turin, the French besieged the city for 117 days without conquering it. By the Treaty of Utrecht the Duke of Savoy acquired Sicily, soon traded for Sardinia, and part of the former Duchy of Milan, and obtained the title of King of Sardinia; thus Turin became the capital of a European kingdom. The architect Filippo Juvarra began a major redesign of the city; Turin had about 90,000 inhabitants at the time.

=== Late, modern, and contemporary ===
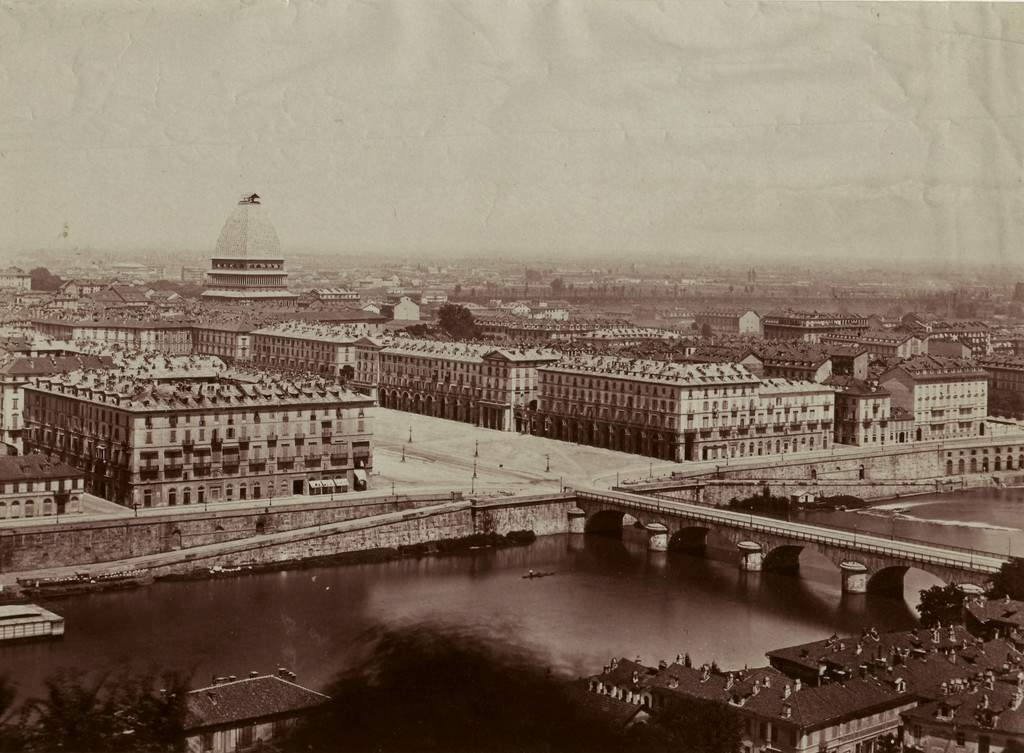
A view of Turin in the late 19th century. In the background, the Mole Antonelliana is under construction.

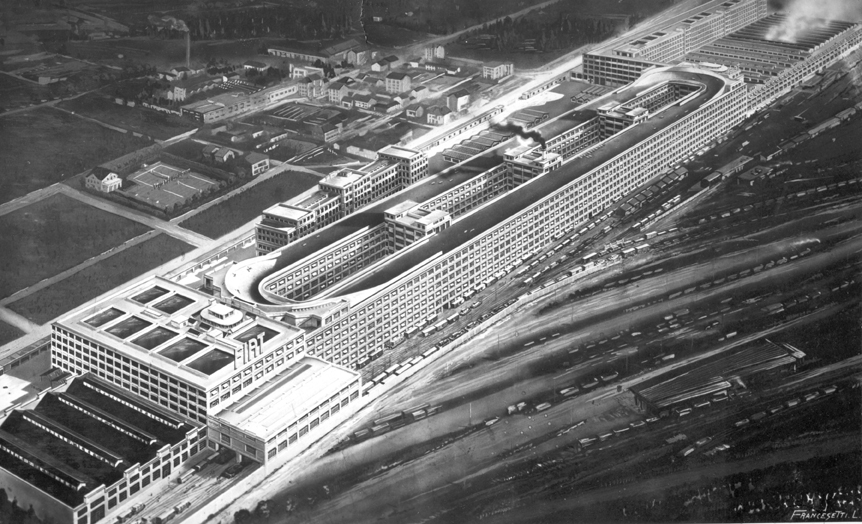
Fiat Lingotto factory in 1928

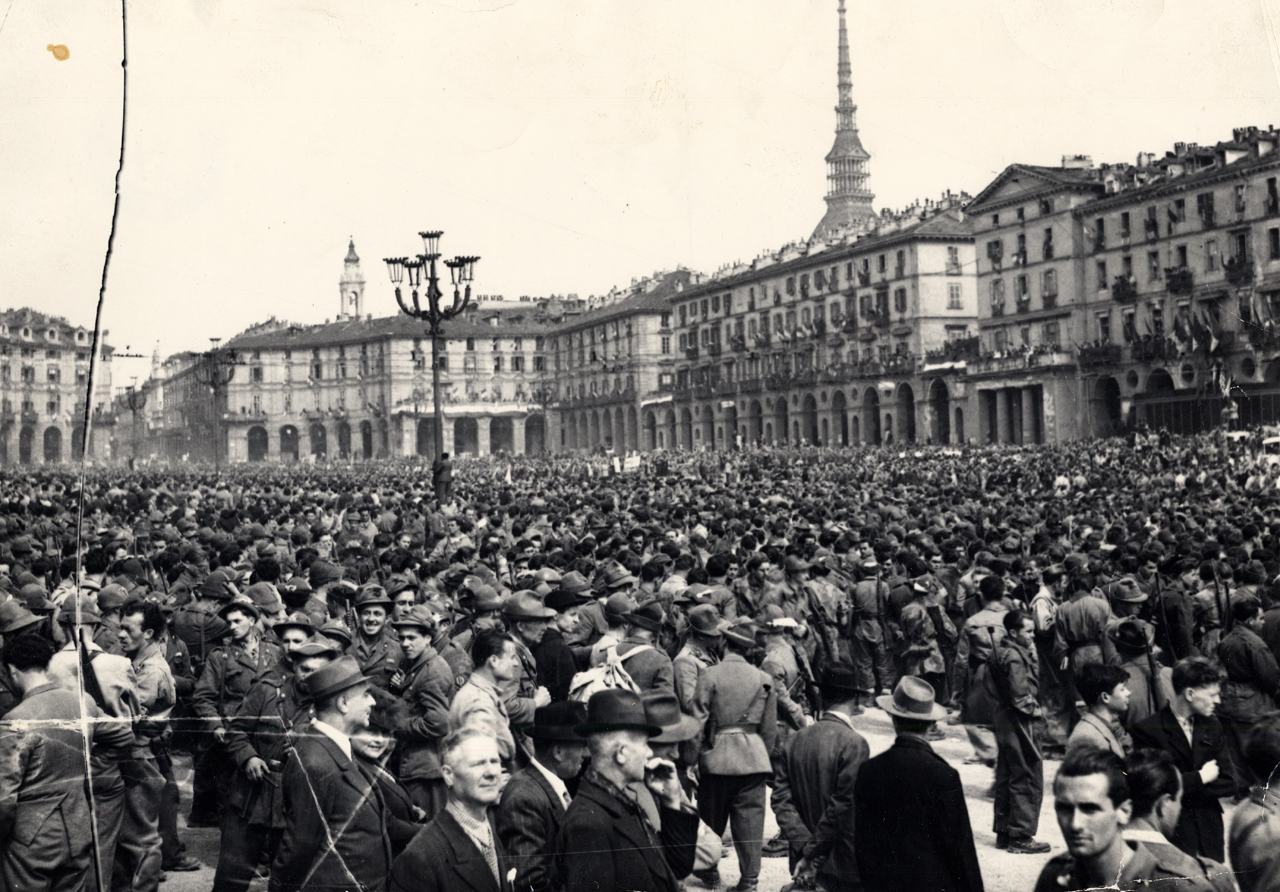
Liberation of Italy parade in Turin on 6 May 1945.

Turin, like the rest of Piedmont, was annexed by the French Empire in 1802. The city thus became the seat of the prefecture of Pô department until the fall of Napoleon in 1814, when the Kingdom of Piedmont-Sardinia was restored with Turin as its capital. In the following decades, the Kingdom of Piedmont-Sardinia led the struggle towards the unification of Italy. In 1861, Turin became the capital of the newly proclaimed united Kingdom of Italy, having been the political and intellectual centre of the Risorgimento movement. In 1865, the capital was moved to Florence, and then to Rome after the 1870 conquest of the Papal States.

The 1871 opening of the Fréjus Tunnel made Turin an important communication node between Italy and France. The city in that period had 250,000 inhabitants. Some of the most iconic landmarks of the city, such as the Mole Antonelliana, the Egyptian Museum, the Gran Madre di Dio church and Piazza Vittorio Veneto, were built in this period.

The late 19th century was also a period of rapid industrialisation, especially in the automotive sector: in 1899 Fiat was established in the city, followed by Lancia in 1906. The Universal Exposition held in Turin in 1902 is often regarded as the pinnacle of Art Nouveau design, and the city hosted the same event in 1911. By this time, Turin had grown to 430,000 inhabitants.

After World War I, harsh conditions brought a wave of strikes and workers' protests. In 1920 the Lingotto Fiat factory was occupied. The Fascist regime in Italy put an end to the social unrest, banning trade unions and jailing socialist leaders, notably Antonio Gramsci. On the other hand, Benito Mussolini largely subsidised the automotive industry, in order to provide vehicles to the army.

Turin was a target of Allied strategic bombing during World War II, being heavily damaged by the air raids in its industrial areas as well as in the city centre. Along with Milan, Genoa, and La Spezia, Turin was one of Italy's four cities that suffered area bombing by the RAF; the heaviest raid took place on 13 July 1943, when 295 bombers dropped 763 tons of bombs, killing 792 people. Overall, these raids killed 2,069 inhabitants of Turin, and destroyed or damaged 54% of all buildings in the city.

In March 1943 the city's factories were the starting point of the first mass strikes in Fascist Italy.

The Allies' campaign in Italy started from the south and slowly moved northwards in the following two years. The northern regions were occupied by Germans and collaborationist forces for several years. Turin was not captured by the Allies until the end of the Spring Offensive of 1945. By the time the vanguard of the armoured reconnaissance units of the Brazilian Expeditionary Force reached the city, it was already freed by the Italian Partisans. They had begun revolting against the Germans and the Italian RSI troops on 25 April 1945. Days later, troops from the US Army's 1st Armored and 92nd Infantry Divisions came to substitute for the Brazilians.

In the postwar years, Turin was rapidly rebuilt. The city's automotive industry played a pivotal role in the Italian economic miracle of the 1950s and 1960s, attracting hundreds of thousands of migrants to the city, particularly from the rural southern regions of Italy. The number of migrants was so high that Turin was said to be "the third southern Italian city after Naples and Palermo". The population soon reached 1 million in 1960 and peaked at almost 1.2 million in 1971. The exceptional growth gains of the city gained it the nickname of Capitale dell'automobile (Automobile Capital), being often compared with Detroit, the major centre of the U.S. automobile industry (these cities were 'twinned' as sister cities in 1998).

In the 1970s and 1980s, the oil and automotive industry crisis severely hit the city, and its population began to sharply decline as jobs were lost. In 30 years, the population decreased by more than one-fourth of the 1971 total. The long population decline of the city has begun to reverse itself only in recent years; the population grew from 865,000 to slightly over 900,000 by the end of the 20th century. In 2006, Turin hosted the Winter Olympic Games.

== Geography ==
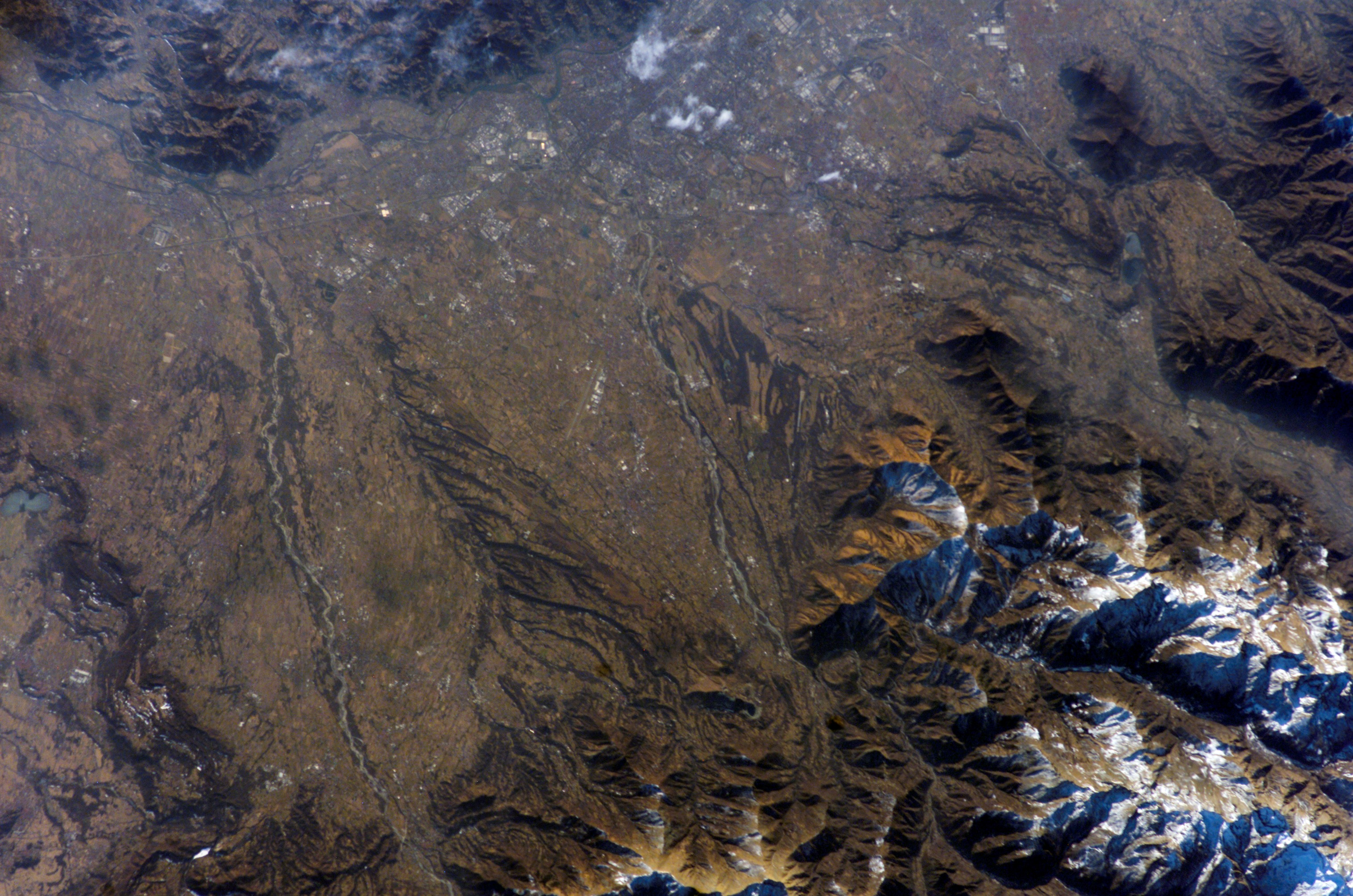
Turin from space. North is on the left.

Turin is in northwest Italy. It is surrounded on the western and northern front by the Alps and on the eastern front by a high hill that is the natural continuation of the hills of Monferrato. Four major rivers pass through the city: the Po and three of its tributaries, the River Dora Riparia (once known as Duria Minor by the Romans, from the Celtic noun duria, 'water'), the Stura di Lanzo and the Sangone.

=== Climate ===
Located in northwestern Italy at the foot of the Alps, Turin features a mid-latitude, four seasons humid subtropical climate (Köppen: Cfa), similar to that of Grenoble, located not far away in the French Alps.

Winters are moderately cold and dry; summers are mild in the hills and quite hot in the plains. Rain falls mostly during spring and autumn; during the hottest months, otherwise, rains are less frequent but heavier (thunderstorms are frequent). During the winter and autumn months banks of fog, which are sometimes very thick, form in the plains but rarely on the city because of its location at the end of the Susa Valley. Snowfalls are not uncommon during the winter months, though substantial accumulation is quite uncommon.

Its position on the east side of the Alps makes the weather drier than on the west side because of the föhn wind effect.

The highest temperature ever recorded was 37.1 °C (98.8 °F) on 11 August 2003, and the lowest was −21.8 °C (−7.2 °F) on 12 February 1956.

Climate data for Torino Caselle Airport, (1991–2020 normals, extremes 1753–present)
Month	Jan	Feb	Mar	Apr	May	Jun	Jul	Aug	Sep	Oct	Nov	Dec	Year
Record high °C (°F)	25.1 (77.2)	26.6 (79.9)	27.4 (81.3)	31.0 (87.8)	32.3 (90.1)	35.6 (96.1)	36.8 (98.2)	37.1 (98.8)	32.7 (90.9)	30.0 (86.0)	22.8 (73.0)	21.4 (70.5)	37.1 (98.8)
Mean daily maximum °C (°F)	8.0 (46.4)	10.2 (50.4)	14.8 (58.6)	18.0 (64.4)	22.2 (72.0)	26.4 (79.5)	29.0 (84.2)	28.6 (83.5)	23.9 (75.0)	18.1 (64.6)	12.2 (54.0)	8.3 (46.9)	18.3 (65.0)
Daily mean °C (°F)	3.3 (37.9)	4.9 (40.8)	9.2 (48.6)	12.6 (54.7)	16.9 (62.4)	21.0 (69.8)	23.2 (73.8)	22.8 (73.0)	18.6 (65.5)	13.5 (56.3)	7.9 (46.2)	3.8 (38.8)	13.1 (55.7)
Mean daily minimum °C (°F)	−1.5 (29.3)	−0.3 (31.5)	3.7 (38.7)	7.2 (45.0)	11.6 (52.9)	15.5 (59.9)	17.4 (63.3)	17.1 (62.8)	13.3 (55.9)	8.9 (48.0)	3.5 (38.3)	−0.7 (30.7)	8.0 (46.4)
Record low °C (°F)	−18.5 (−1.3)	−21.8 (−7.2)	−10.5 (13.1)	−3.8 (25.2)	−2.3 (27.9)	4.3 (39.7)	6.6 (43.9)	6.3 (43.3)	1.8 (35.2)	−3.9 (25.0)	−8.2 (17.2)	−15.0 (5.0)	−21.8 (−7.2)
Average precipitation mm (inches)	47.8 (1.88)	47.1 (1.85)	72.5 (2.85)	113.3 (4.46)	145.3 (5.72)	104.3 (4.11)	70.5 (2.78)	76.1 (3.00)	83.8 (3.30)	106.1 (4.18)	69.1 (2.72)	45.1 (1.78)	981.0 (38.62)
Average precipitation days (≥ 1.0 mm)	5.4	4.4	5.8	8.6	11.2	8.6	5.8	7.7	6.4	7.0	5.6	4.4	80.9
Average relative humidity (%)	75	75	67	72	75	74	72	73	75	79	80	80	75
Mean monthly sunshine hours	111.6	118.7	158.1	180.0	195.3	219.0	260.4	223.2	168.0	142.6	105.0	108.5	1,990.4
Source 1: Istituto Superiore per la Protezione e la Ricerca Ambientale
Source 2: Italian Air Force Meteorological Service (precipitation, humidity and sun 1971–2000)

== Demographics ==
Historical population
Year	Pop.	±%
1861	173,305	—
1871	210,873	+21.7%
1881	250,655	+18.9%
1901	329,691	+31.5%
1911	415,667	+26.1%
1921	499,823	+20.2%
1931	590,753	+18.2%
1936	629,115	+6.5%
1951	719,300	+14.3%
1961	1,025,822	+42.6%
1971	1,167,968	+13.9%
1981	1,117,154	−4.4%
1991	962,507	−13.8%
2001	865,263	−10.1%
2011	872,367	+0.8%
2021	848,748	−2.7%
Source: ISTAT

As of 2026, the population is 855,654, of which 48.4% are male, and 51.6% are female. Minors make up 13.4% of the population, and seniors make up 26.1%.

=== Immigration ===
Foreign population by country of birth (2025)
Country of birth	Population
Romania	34,353
Morocco	19,741
Peru	11,173
Albania	7,368
Egypt	6,711
China	5,851
Moldova	5,454
Nigeria	4,692
Argentina	4,420
Brazil	4,184
Iran	3,677
Philippines	3,403
Bangladesh	3,174
Tunisia	2,971
France	2,585

As of 2025, immigrants make up 18.7% of the total population. The 5 largest foreign countries of birth are Romania, Morocco, Peru, Albania, and Egypt.

== Administration ==
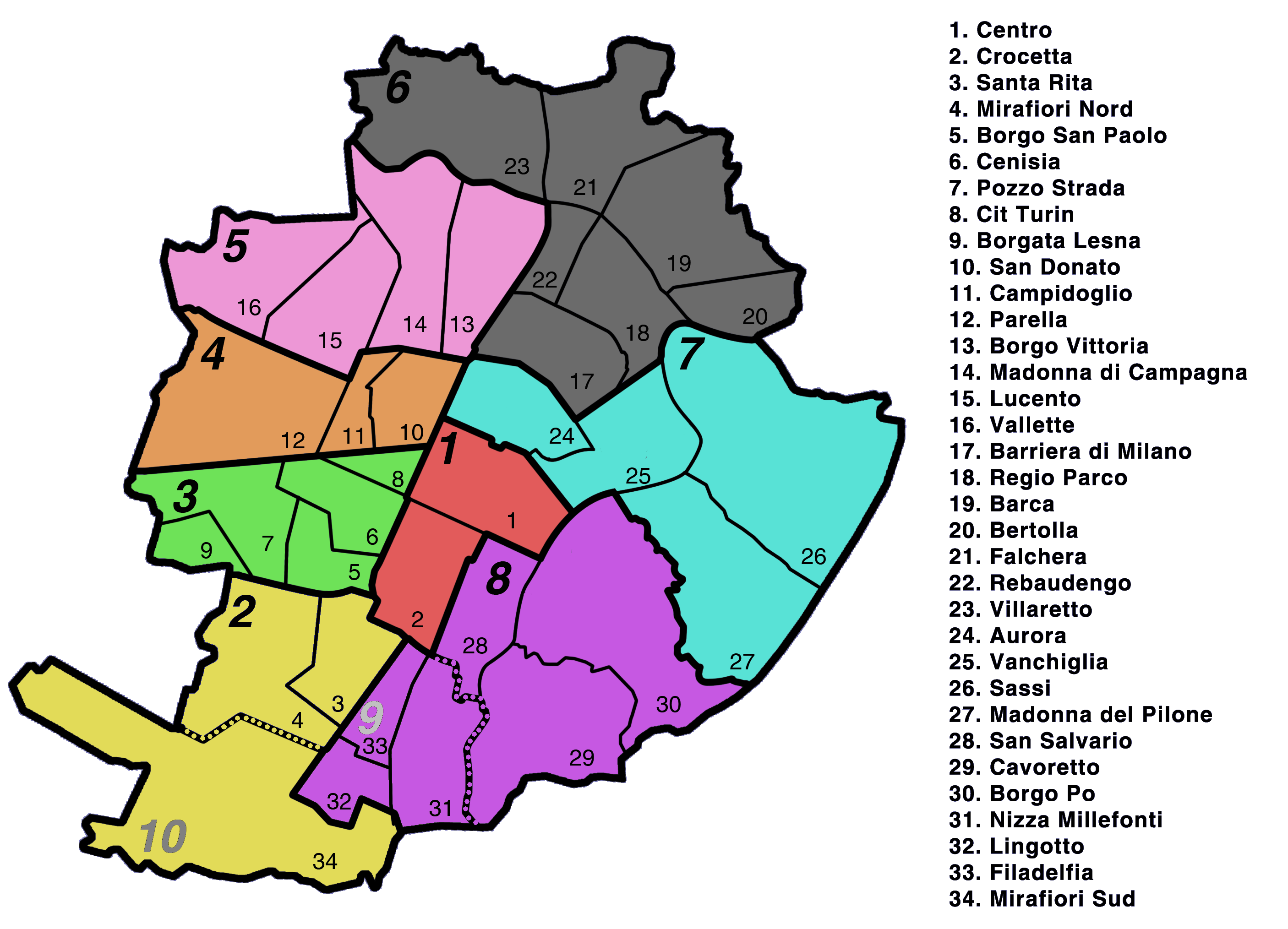
Administrative map of Turin

Turin is split up into 8 boroughs, locally called circoscrizioni; these do not necessarily correspond to the historical districts of the city, which are rather called quartieri, rioni, borghi, borgate or zone. The circoscrizioni system originally comprised 10 of them, that were reduced to 8 by merging borough 9 into 8, and 10 into 2.

The following list enumerates the boroughs and the location of the historical districts inside them:

- Circoscrizione 1: Centro – Crocetta
- Circoscrizione 2: Santa Rita – Mirafiori Nord – Mirafiori Sud
- Circoscrizione 3: San Paolo – Cenisia – Pozzo Strada – Cit Turin – Borgata Lesna
- Circoscrizione 4: San Donato – Campidoglio – Parella
- Circoscrizione 5: Borgo Vittoria – Madonna di Campagna – Lucento – Vallette
- Circoscrizione 6: Barriera di Milano – Regio Parco – Barca – Bertolla – Falchera – Rebaudengo – Villaretto
- Circoscrizione 7: Aurora – Vanchiglia – Sassi – Madonna del Pilone
- Circoscrizione 8: San Salvario – Cavoretto – Borgo Po – Nizza Millefonti – Lingotto – Filadelfia

The mayor of Turin is directly elected every five years. The current mayor of the city is Stefano Lo Russo (PD), elected in 2021.

== Cityscape ==
=== City centre ===
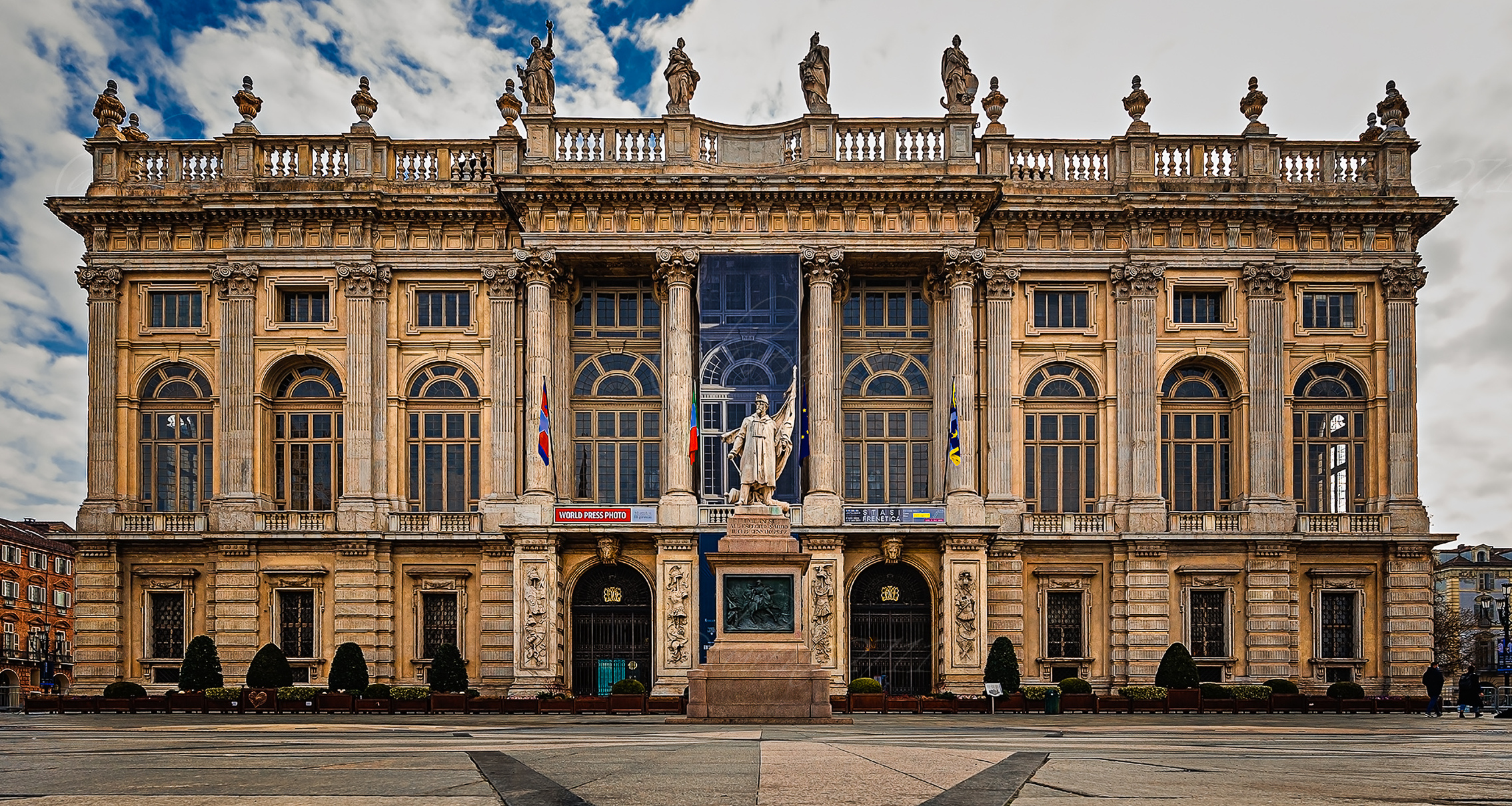
Palazzo Madama façade

Turin's historical architecture is predominantly Baroque and was developed under the Savoyard state. Nonetheless, the main street of the city centre, Via Roma, was built during the Fascist era (from 1931 to 1937) as an example of Italian Rationalism, replacing former buildings already present in this area.

Via Roma runs between Piazza Carlo Felice and Piazza Castello. Buildings on the portion between Piazza Carlo Felice and Piazza San Carlo were designed by rationalist architect Marcello Piacentini. These blocks were built into a reticular system, composed by austere buildings in clear rationalist style, such as the impressive Hotel Principi di Piemonte and the former Hotel Nazionale in Piazza CLN. Porches are built in a continuous entablature and marked with double columns, to be consistent with those of Piazza San Carlo. The section of the street between Piazza San Carlo and Piazza Castello was built in an eclectic style, with arcades characterised by Serliana-type arches. To this day Via Roma is the street featuring the most fashionable boutiques of the city.

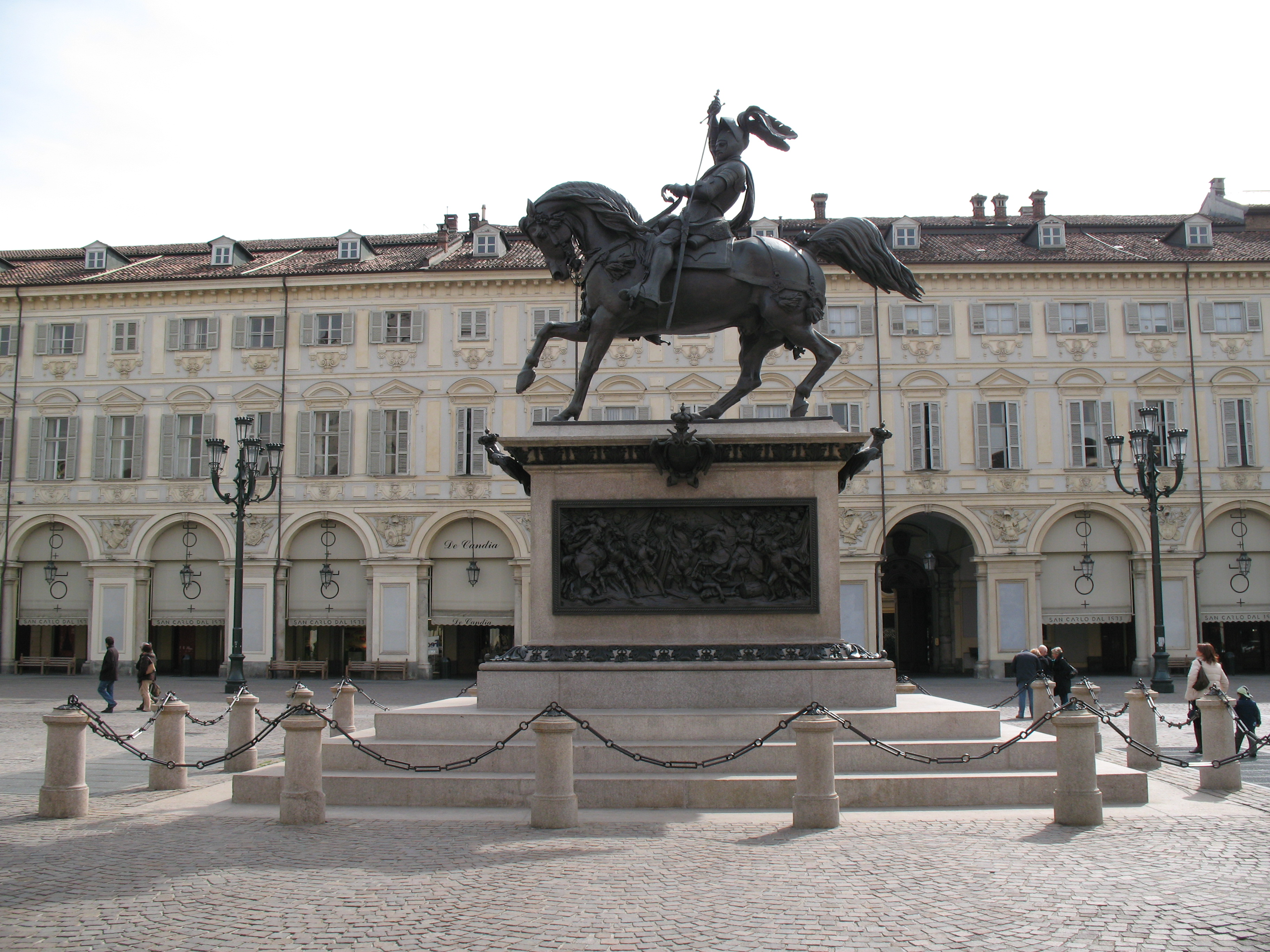
Piazza San Carlo and the Caval 'd Brons (Bronze Horse in Piedmontese language), equestrian monument to Emmanuel Philibert

Via Roma crosses one of the main squares of the city: the pedestrianised Piazza San Carlo, built by Carlo di Castellamonte in the 17th century. In the middle of the square stands the equestrian monument to Emmanuel Philibert, also known as Caval ëd Brons in the local dialect ('Bronze Horse'); the monument depicts the Duke sheathing his sword after the Battle of St. Quentin. Piazza San Carlo arcades host the most ancient cafés of the city, such as Caffé Torino and Caffé San Carlo.

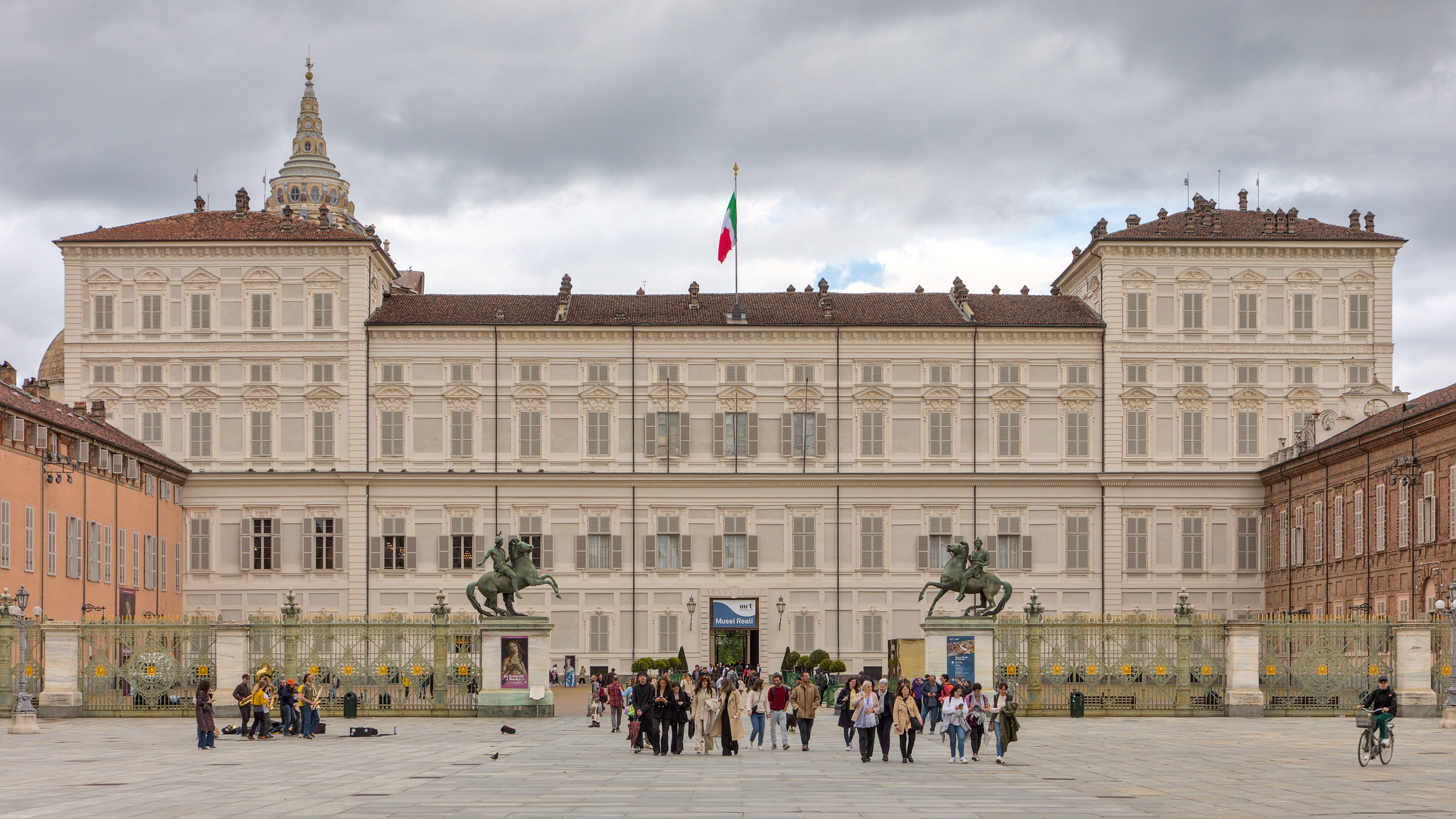
Piazza Castello with Palazzo Reale (Royal Palace) in the background

At the northern end of Via Roma stands Piazza Castello, regarded as the heart of the city. The half-pedestrianised square hosts some significant buildings such as Palazzo Reale (Former Savoy Royal House), the Palazzo Madama (which previously hosted the Savoy senate and, for few years, the Italian senate after Italian unification), the former Baroque Teatro Regio di Torino (rebuilt in modern style in the 1960s, after being destroyed by fire), the Royal Library of Turin which hosts the Leonardo da Vinci self-portrait, and the baroque Royal Church of San Lorenzo. Moreover, Piazza Castello hosts a Fascist era building, the Torre Littoria, a sort of skyscraper which was supposed to become the headquarters of the Fascist party, although it never served as such. The building's style is quite different from the Baroque style of Piazza Castello. The square regularly hosts the main open space events of the city, live concerts included.

Porta Nuova main railway station

As for the southern part of the street, Via Roma ends in Piazza Carlo Felice and in its Giardino Sambuy, a wide fenced garden right in the middle of the square. Across from Piazza Carlo Felice stands the monumental façade of Porta Nuova railway station, the central station of the city built between 1861 and 1868 by the architect Alessandro Mazzucchetti. The passengers building was renovated to host a shopping mall and more efficient passenger service offices. However, it is still an example of monumental architecture, with its stately foyer and some Baroque sights, such as the Sala Reale (the former Royal waiting room).

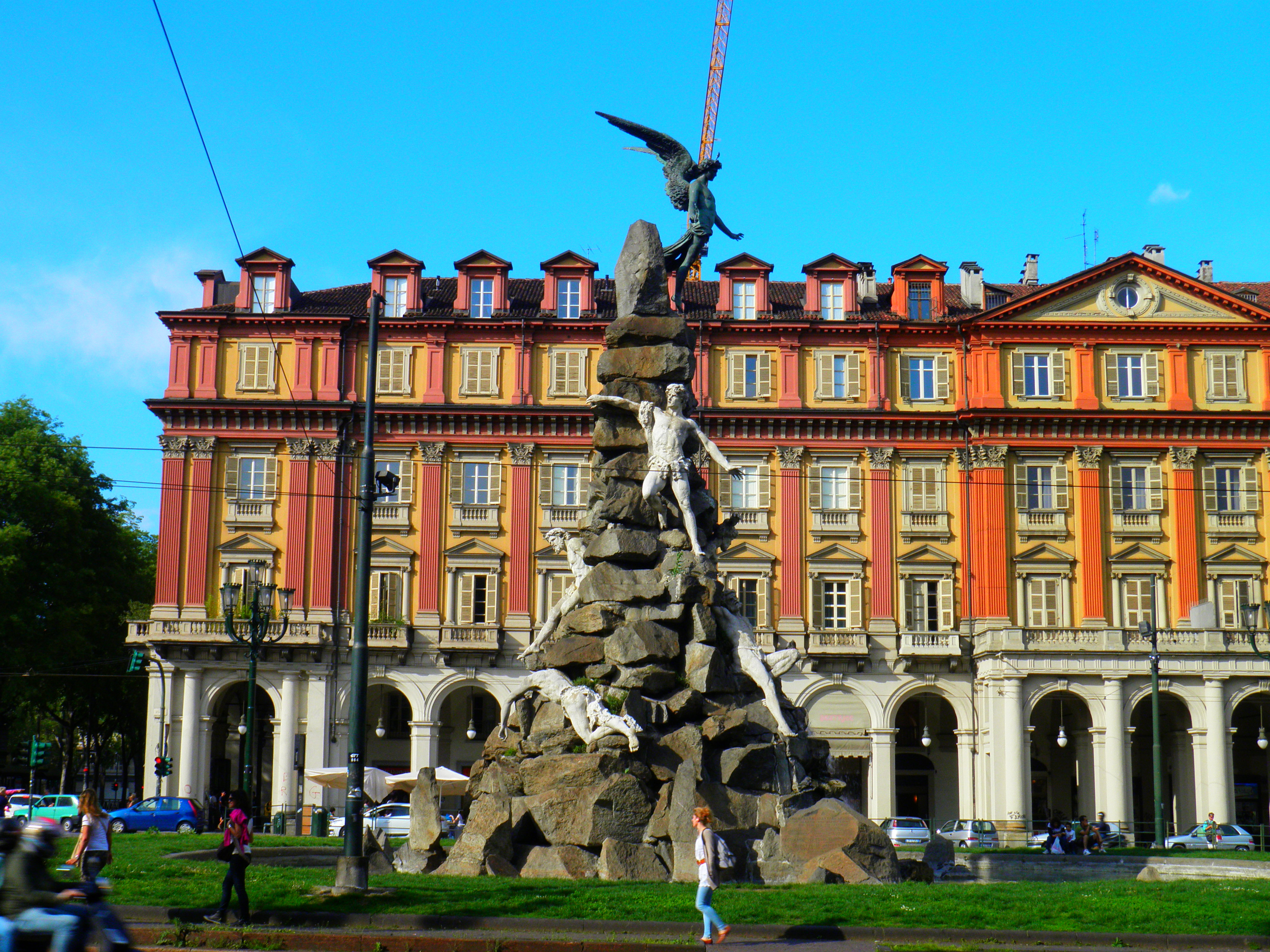
Piazza Statuto square

In Piazza Castello converge some of the main streets of the city centre. Among them, one of the most significant is the arcaded Via Po, built by Amedeo di Castellamonte in 1674 and featuring some interesting buildings, such as the first and original building of the University of Turin and the historical Caffè Fiorio, which was the favourite café of the 19th-century politicians. Via Po ends in Piazza Vittorio Veneto (simply called Piazza Vittorio locally), the largest Baroque square in Europe and today heart of Turin nightlife. Piazza Vittorio features the most fashionable bars and not far from here, along the Po riverfront, the Murazzi quays used to host several bars and nightclubs open until the morning until a few years ago.

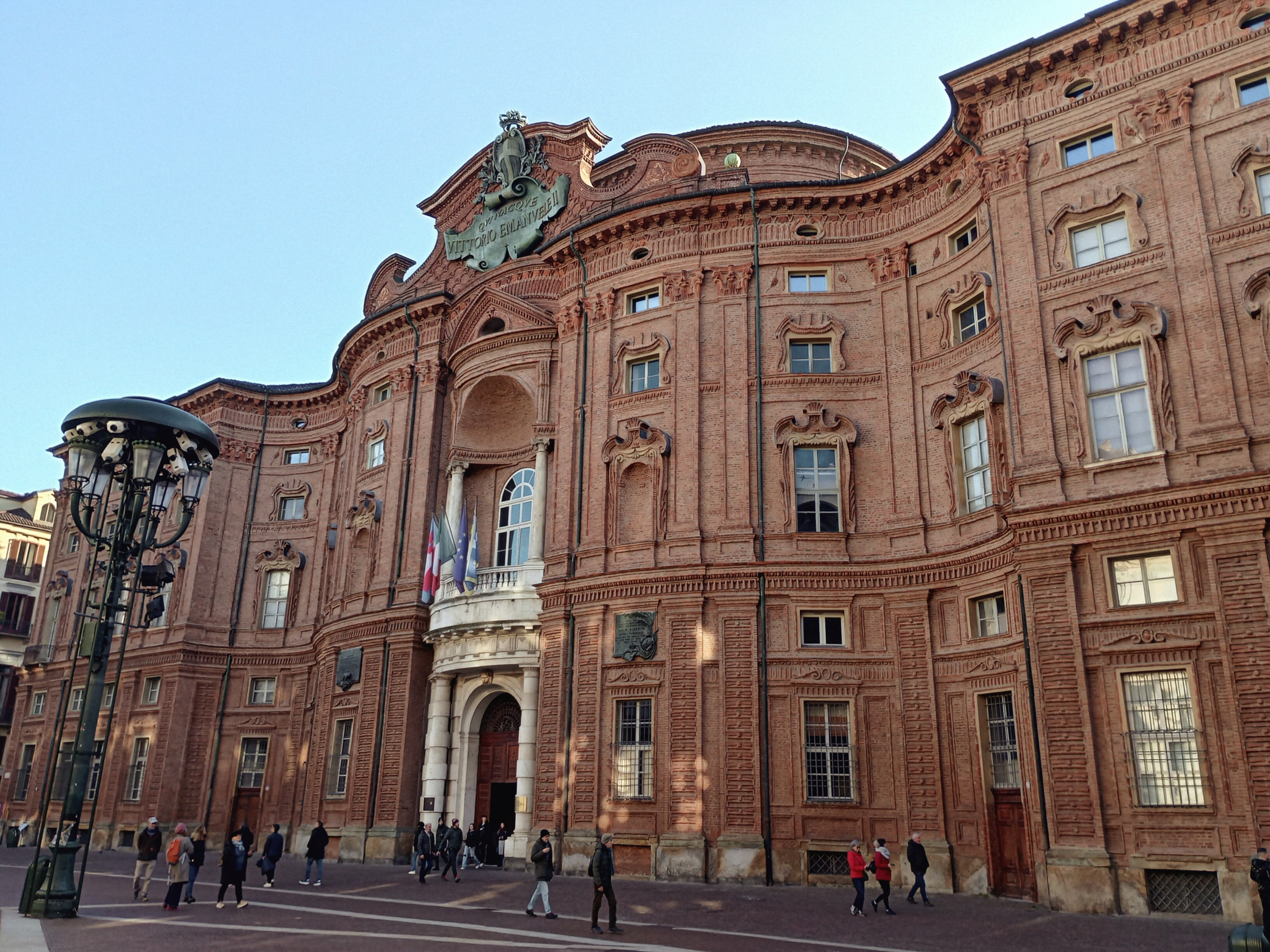
Baroque façade of Palazzo Carignano, the Museum of the Risorgimento

Parallel to Via Roma, the other two popular pedestrian streets, namely Via Lagrange and Via Carlo Alberto, cross the old town from Via Po to Corso Vittorio Emanuele II. Their recent pedestrianisation has improved their original commercial vocation. In particular, Via Lagrange has recently increased the presence of luxury boutiques. This street also hosts the Egyptian Museum of Turin, home to what is regarded as one of the largest collections of Egyptian antiquities outside of Egypt.

Via Lagrange and Via Carlo Alberto cross two significant squares of the city, respectively. The former crosses Piazza Carignano, well known mainly for the undulating "concave – convex-concave" Baroque façade of Palazzo Carignano. This building used to host the Parlamento Subalpino (the 'Subalpine Parliament', Parliament of the Kingdom of Sardinia which also became the Italian Parliament for a few years, after the Italian unification) and today houses the Museum of the Risorgimento. The square also features the Teatro Carignano, a well-conserved Baroque theatre. Via Carlo Alberto crosses Piazza Carlo Alberto, a big square hosting the rear façade of Palazzo Carignano, in eclectic style. On the other side stands the monumental Biblioteca Nazionale (National Library).

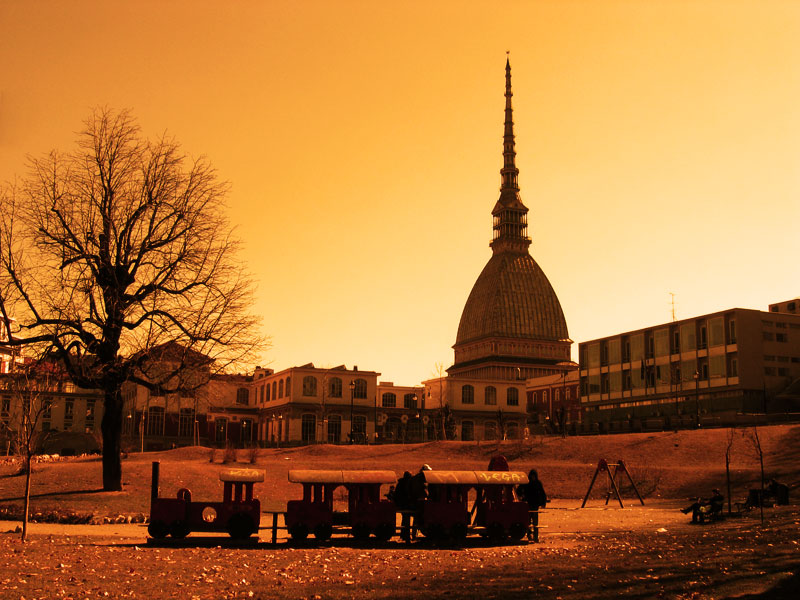
Mole Antonelliana in 2006

Not far from Via Po stands the symbol of Turin, namely the Mole Antonelliana, so named after the architect who built it, Alessandro Antonelli. Construction began in 1863 as a Jewish synagogue. Nowadays it houses the National Museum of Cinema and it is believed to be the tallest museum in the world at 167 m (548 ft). The building is depicted on the Italian 2-cent coin.

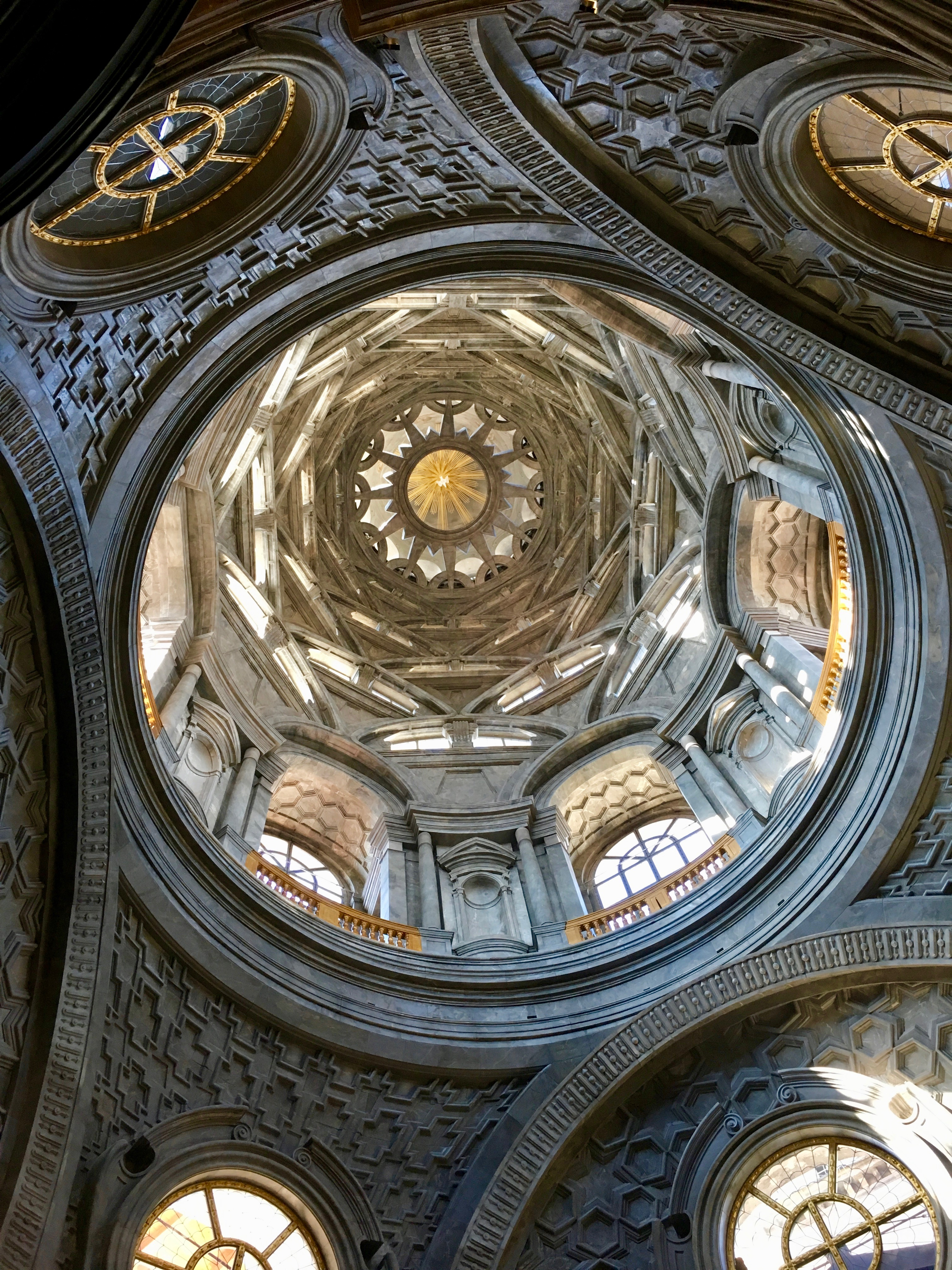
Dome of Turin Cathedral

Just behind Piazza Castello stands the Turin Cathedral, dedicated to Saint John the Baptist, which is the major church of the city. It was built during 1491–1498 and is adjacent to an earlier bell tower (1470). Annexed to the cathedral is the Chapel of the Holy Shroud, the current resting place of the Shroud of Turin. The chapel was added to the structure in 1668–1694, designed by Guarini. The Basilica of Corpus Domini was built to celebrate an alleged miracle which took place during the sack of the city in 1453, when a soldier was carrying off a monstrance containing the Blessed Sacrament; the monstrance fell to the ground, while the host remained suspended in air. The present church, erected in 1610 to replace the original chapel which stood on the spot, is the work of Ascanio Vitozzi.

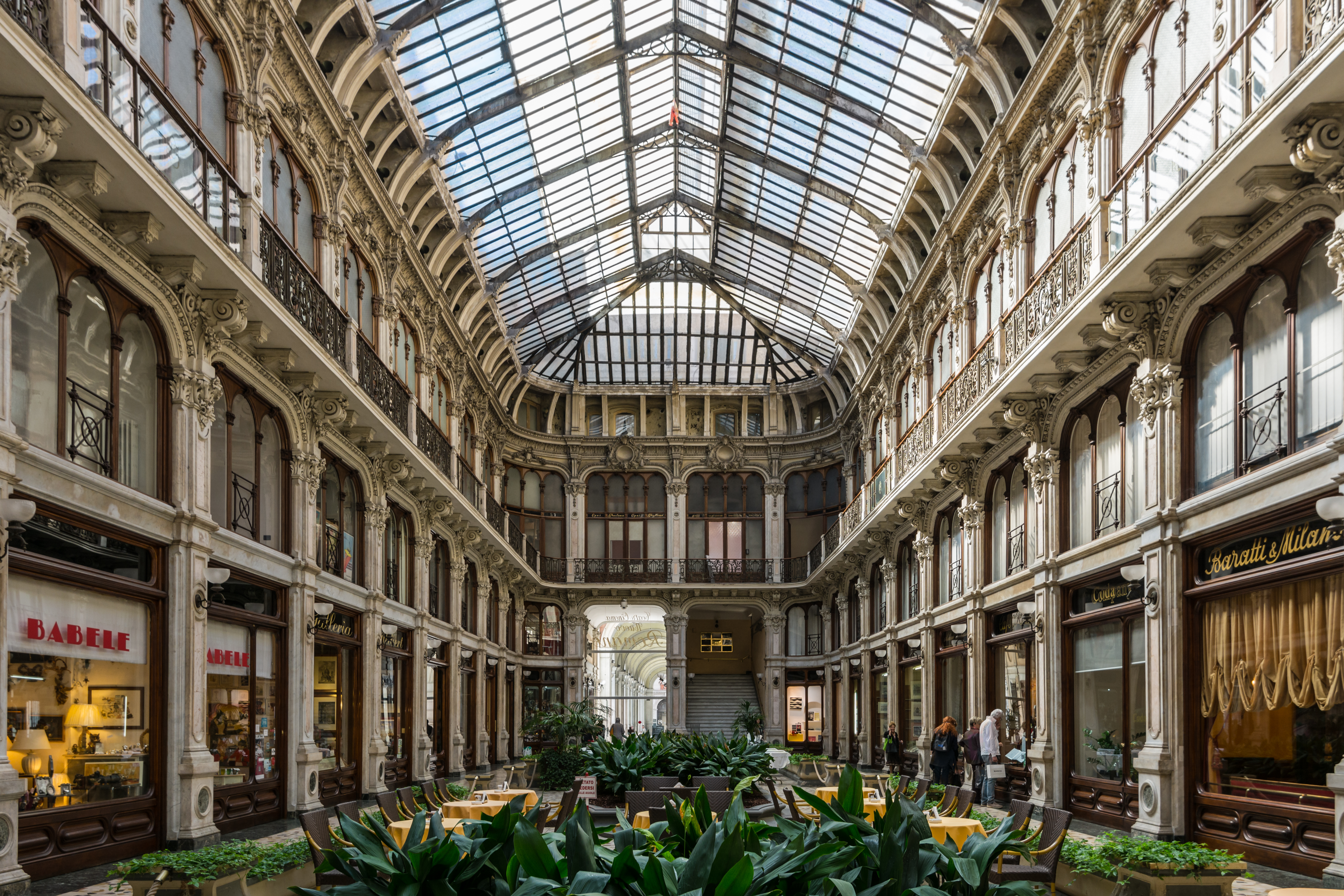
Galleria Subalpina

Next to the Turin Cathedral stand the Palatine Towers, an ancient Roman-medieval structure that served as one of four Roman city gates along the city walls of Turin. This gate allowed access from north to the cardo maximus, the typical second main street of a Roman town. The Palatine Towers are among the best preserved Roman remains in northern Italy. Close to this site, the 51,300 m^{2} (552,189 sq ft) Piazza della Repubblica plays host to the biggest open market in Europe, locally known as mercato di Porta Palazzo (Porta Palazzo or Porta Pila are the historical and local names of this area).

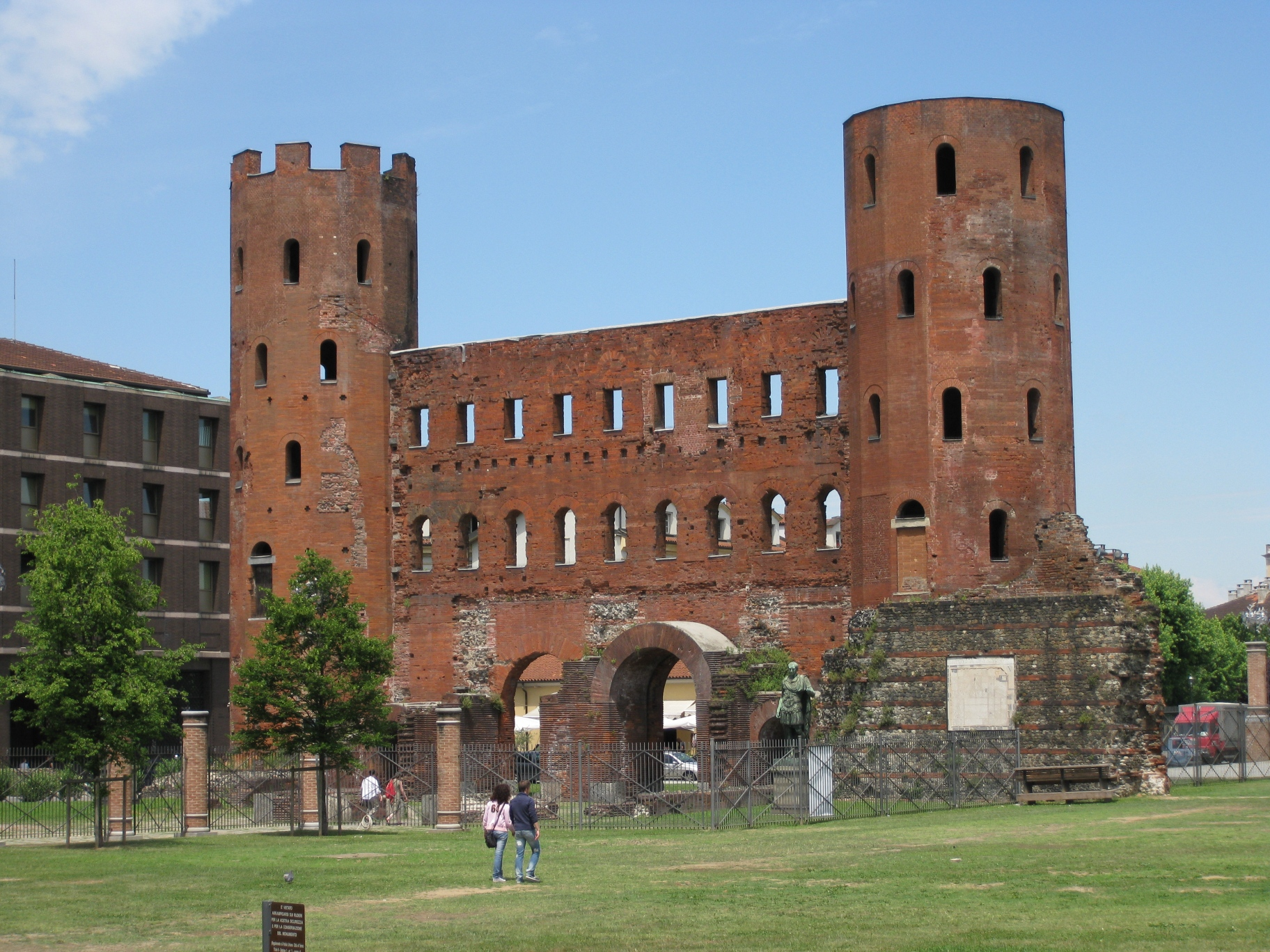
Palatine Towers

West of the Porte Palatine stands the Quadrilatero Romano (Roman Quadrilateral), the old medieval district recently renewed. The current neighbourhood is characterised by its tiny streets and its several medieval buildings and today it is popular for its aperitivo bars and its small shops run by local artisans. The hub of the Quadrilatero is Piazza Emanuele Filiberto.

South of the Quadrilatero Romano stands Via Garibaldi, another popular street of the city. It is a 1 km (0.6 mi) pedestrian street between Piazza Castello and Piazza Statuto which features some of the old shops of the city. Large Piazza Statuto is another example of Baroque square with arcades.

Another main street of downtown is Via Pietro Micca, which starts in Piazza Castello and ends in the large Piazza Solferino. The street continues in Via Cernaia up to Piazza XVIII Dicembre, which features the former Porta Susa passengers building, relocated in 2012 a little more southward. The new and larger passengers building is situated between Corso Bolzano and Corso Inghilterra and is an example of contemporary architecture, being a 300 m-long (980 ft) and 19 m-high (62 ft) glass and steel structure. Porta Susa is currently the international central station of the city (high speed trains to Paris) and it is becoming the central hub of railway transportation of the city, being the station in which local trains (so-called Ferrovie Metropolitane), national trains and high-speed national and international trains converge.

Close to Via Cernaia stands the Cittadella (Citadel), in the Andrea Guglielminetti garden. What remains of the old medieval and modern fortress of the city, it is a starting point for a tour into the old tunnels below the city.

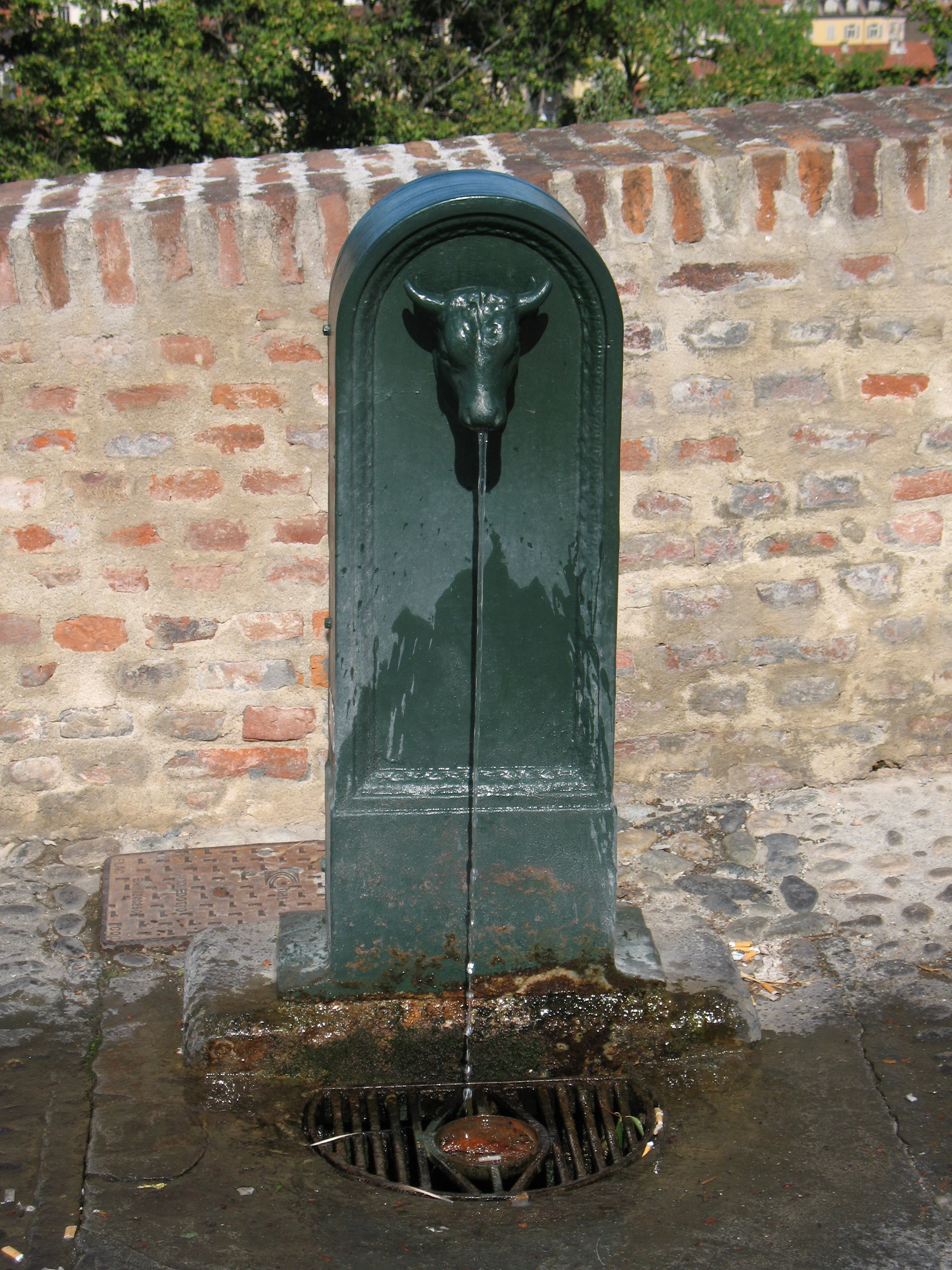
A Torèt at Monte dei Cappuccini

A common sight in the city center, and throughout the city of Turin, are the bull-headed public water fountains, called Torets.

=== San Salvario ===
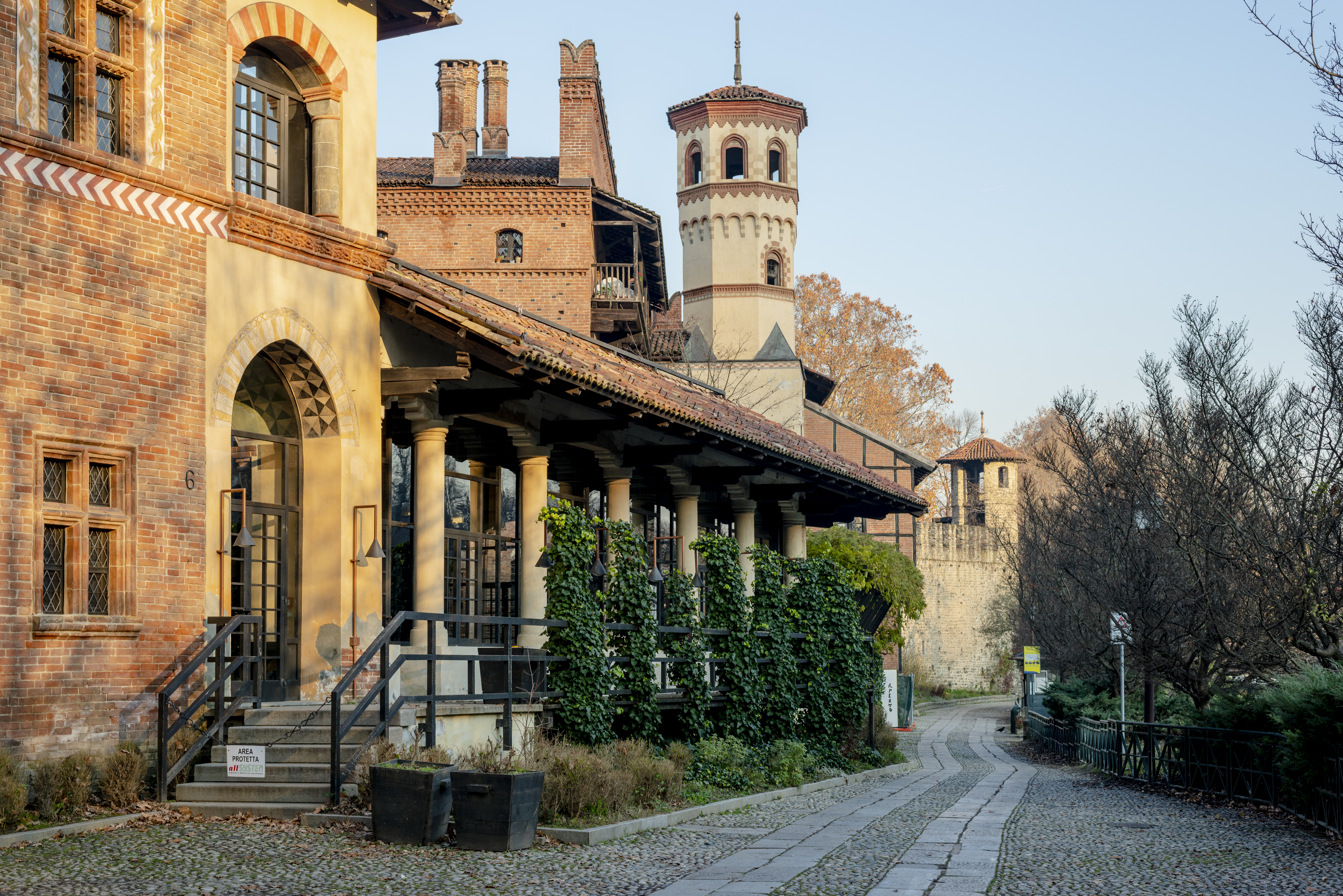
Borgo Medioevale

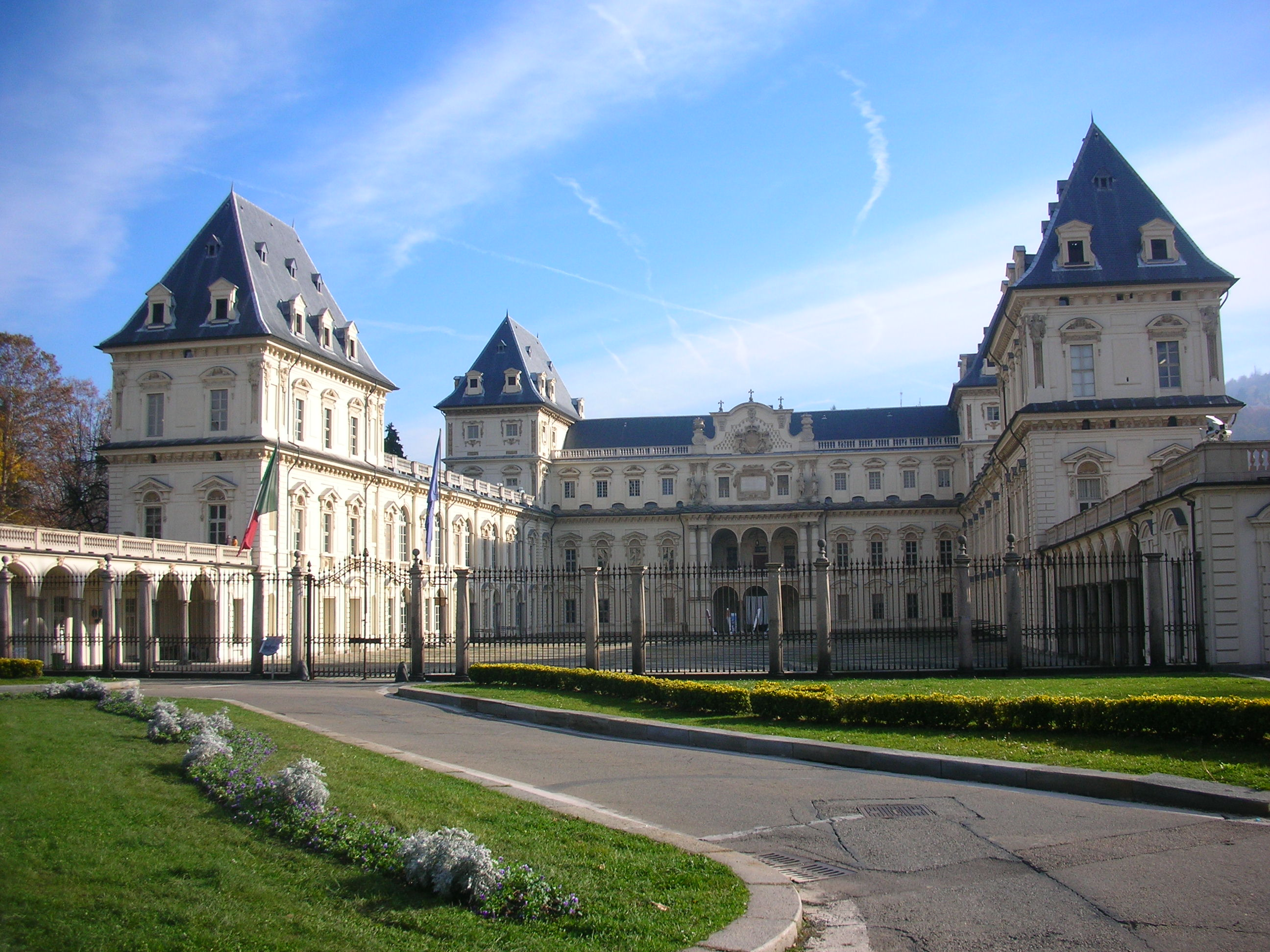
Castello del Valentino in Parco del Valentino

Southeast of the city centre stands San Salvario district, which extends from Corso Vittorio Emanuele II to Corso Bramante and is delimited by the Turin-Genoa railway on the west side and by the River Po on the east side. Home to an increasing immigrants' community, the district is an example of integration among different cultures; it also features an incremented nightlife after the opening of several low-cost bars and restaurants.

San Salvario is crossed by two main roads, Via Nizza and Via Madama Cristina, and just as the city centre it is characterised by the grid plan typical of Turin's old neighbourhoods. The hub of the district is Piazza Madama Cristina which hosts a big open market, while several commercial activities flourish around it.

The celebrated Parco del Valentino is situated in the east side of San Salvario and, albeit not in downtown, it represents a type of central park of Turin. Thanks to the vicinity to the city centre, the park is very popular among the local people, during the day but also at night, because of the several bars and nightclubs placed here. From the terraces of Parco del Valentino, many sights of the hills on the other side of the river can be appreciated.

In the centre of the park stands the Castello del Valentino, built in the 17th century. This castle has a horseshoe shape, with four rectangular towers, one at each angle, and a wide inner court with a marble pavement. The ceilings of the false upper floors are in transalpino (i.e. French) style. The façade sports the huge coat of arms of the House of Savoy. Today, Castello del Valentino serves as the faculty of Architecture of the Polytechnic University of Turin.

Another cluster of buildings in the park is the Borgo Medioevale (Medieval village), a replica of medieval mountain castles of Piedmont and Aosta Valley, built for the 1884 International Exhibition.

Other buildings in Corso Massimo d'Azeglio include the Torino Esposizioni complex (Turin's exhibition hall built in the 1930s) featuring a monumental entrance with a large full height porch, a main hall designed by Pier Luigi Nervi in reinforced concrete, and the Teatro Nuovo, a theatre mostly focused on ballet exhibitions. Another building is the largest synagogue of the city, in Piazzetta Primo Levi, a square. Its architecture stands in the main sight of the city, as characterised by four large towers—27 m (89 ft) high—topped by four onion-shaped domes.

=== Crocetta ===
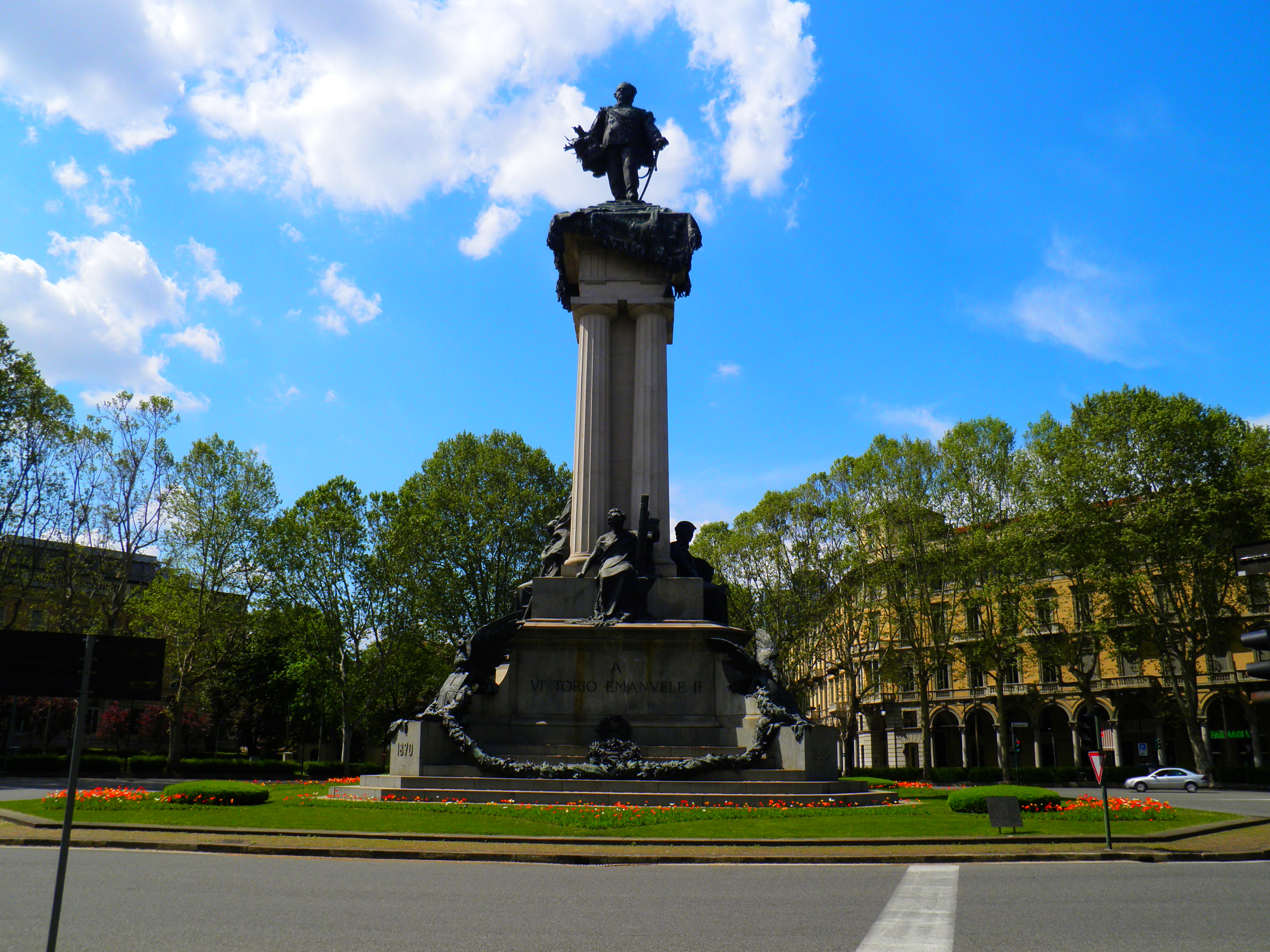
Monumento a Vittorio Emanuele II

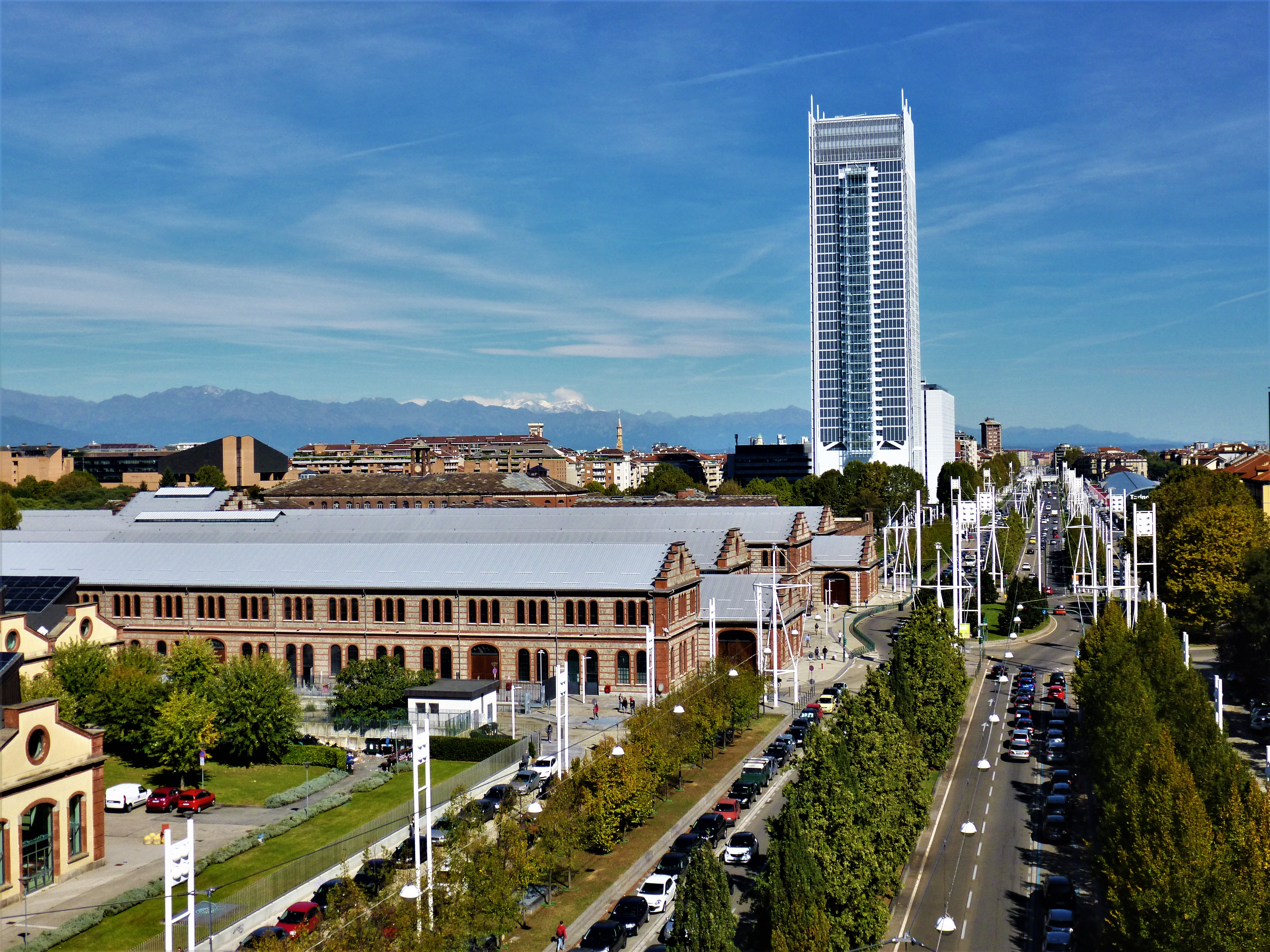
The Polytechnic University of Turin

South of Centro stands the Crocetta district, considered one of the most exclusive districts of the city, because of highly rated residential buildings. At the heart of the district is the partially pedestrianised area crossed by Corso Trieste, Corso Trento and Corso Duca D'Aosta, plenty of some notable residential buildings in eclectic, neo-Gothic and Art Nouveau style. The area was built between 1903 and 1937 replacing the old parade ground, which was moved in the southern part of the city.

North of this area stands the GAM (Galleria d'Arte Moderna), one of the two Museum of Modern Arts of the Turin Metro area (the second and largest one is hosted in Castello di Rivoli, a former Savoy royal castle in the suburbs). The museum stands in front a huge monument situated in the centre of the roundabout between Corso Vittorio Emanuele II and Corso Galileo Ferraris: the Monument to Vittorio Emanuele II, a king of Savoy statue situated on a 39-metres high column. Next to the museum, another significant residential building previously hosted the head office of Juventus, one of the two main Turin football clubs.

West of this area, the main building of Polytechnic University of Turin stands along Corso Duca Degli Abruzzi. The 1958 building, a 122,000 m^{2} (1,313,197 sq ft) complex, hosts approximately 30,000 students and is considered one of the major institutes of technology of the country—mainly due to the vocation of the city for the industrialisation, pushed by the automotive sector. This institute recently expanded in the western district of Cenisia with additional modern buildings.

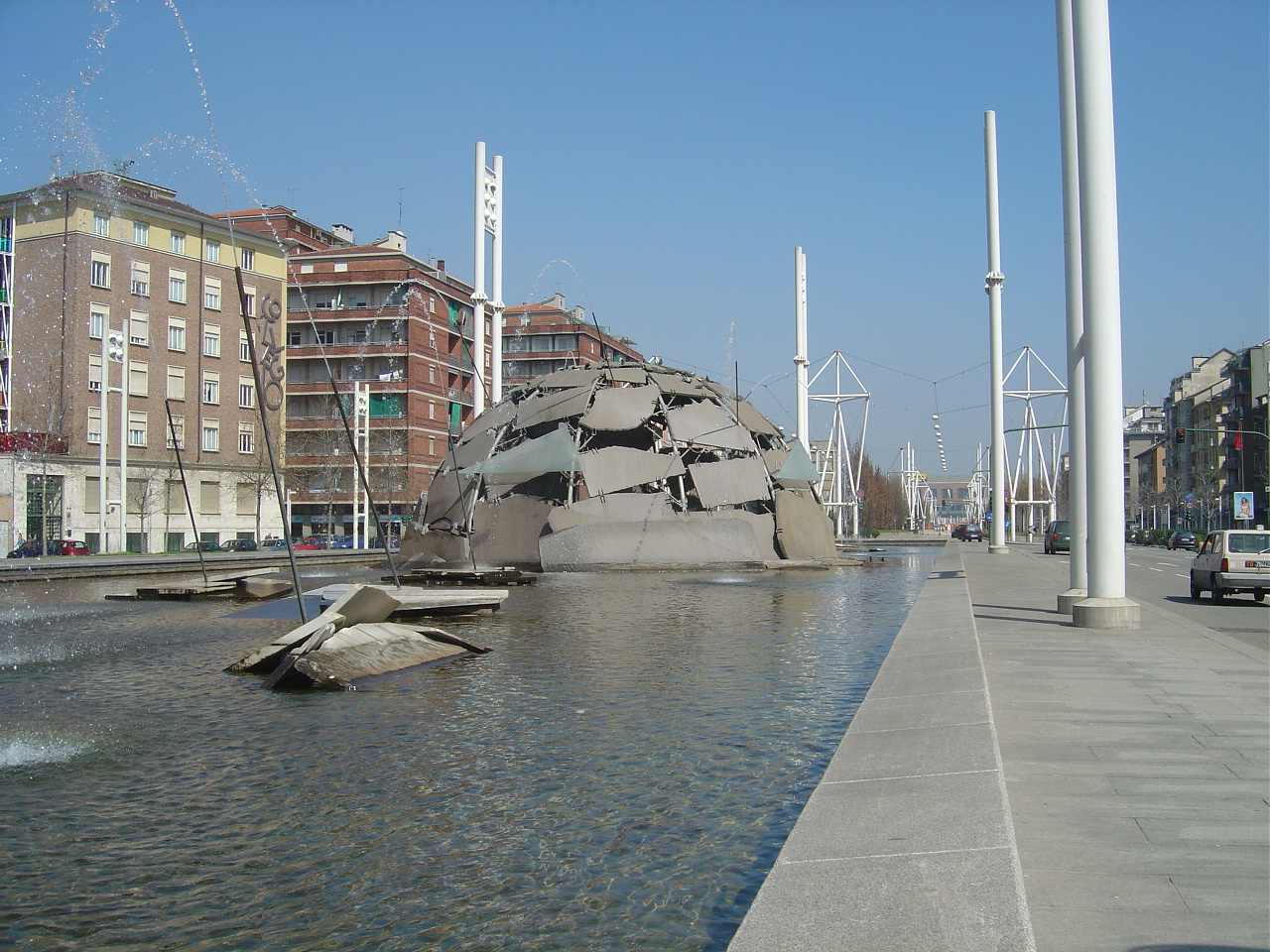
The Spina Centrale is a new under-construction boulevard built over the undergrounded railway. It is already completed in Crocetta.

Crocetta is crossed by large and modern avenues, such as Corso Duca degli Abruzzi, Corso Galileo Ferraris, and Corso Einaudi. These avenues feature long rows of trees, symbolic of Turin's typical urbanity. However, the most popular avenue is Corso De Gasperi, which, albeit smaller than other avenues of the district, hosts one of the most fashionable open markets of the city, the so-called Mercato della Crocetta, in which it is possible to find some discounted branded clothing among the more popular ones.

The Western border of Crocetta is instead an example of contemporary architecture. The huge avenue, made up of Corso Mediterraneo and Corso Castelfidardo, is part of Spina Centrale boulevard and was recently built over the old railway (now undergrounded): as a result, the avenue is very large (up to 60 m (200 ft)) and modern, having been rebuilt with valuable materials, including a characteristic lighting system supported by white high poles. This avenue hosts some examples of contemporary art, such as Mario Merz's Igloo fountain or the Per Kirkeby's Opera per Torino monument in Largo Orbassano.

The East side of the district is also known as Borgo San Secondo named after the church of the same name standing in Via San Secondo, a major street in the neighbourhood. This is near Porta Nuova railway station and is older than the rest of the district, featuring several apartment buildings from the late 19th century, to include the birthplace and home of author Primo Levi on Corso Re Umberto. A local open market is held in Piazza San Secondo and along Via Legnano. The market square also hosts the former washhouse and public baths of the neighbourhood, among the oldest examples of their kind in Turin (1905).

One of the main thoroughfares crossing Borgo San Secondo is Via Sacchi, which serves as an ideal gate to the city centre: its Serlian arcades on the west side of the street (the east side is enclosed by Porta Nuova railway station service buildings) host some significant boutiques and hotels, such as the historic Pfatisch pastry shop and the Turin Palace Hotel (totally refurbished and reopened in 2015). South of Via Sacchi, Ospedale Mauriziano is one of the ancient and major hospitals of the city. Going further southwards, it is possible to appreciate an interesting residential cluster of old public housing gravitating around Via Arquata.

=== Cenisia ===
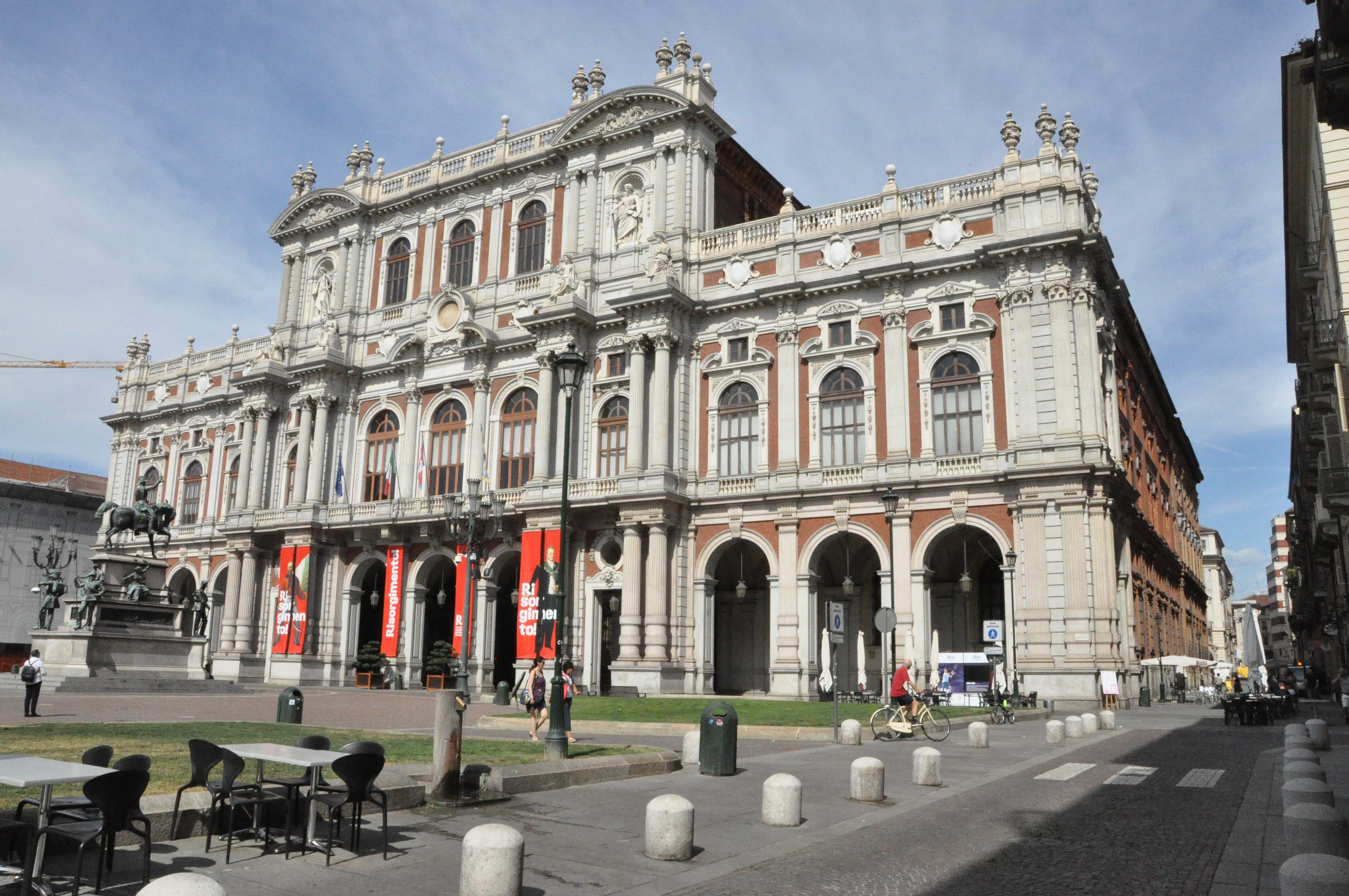
The Piazza Carlo Alberto

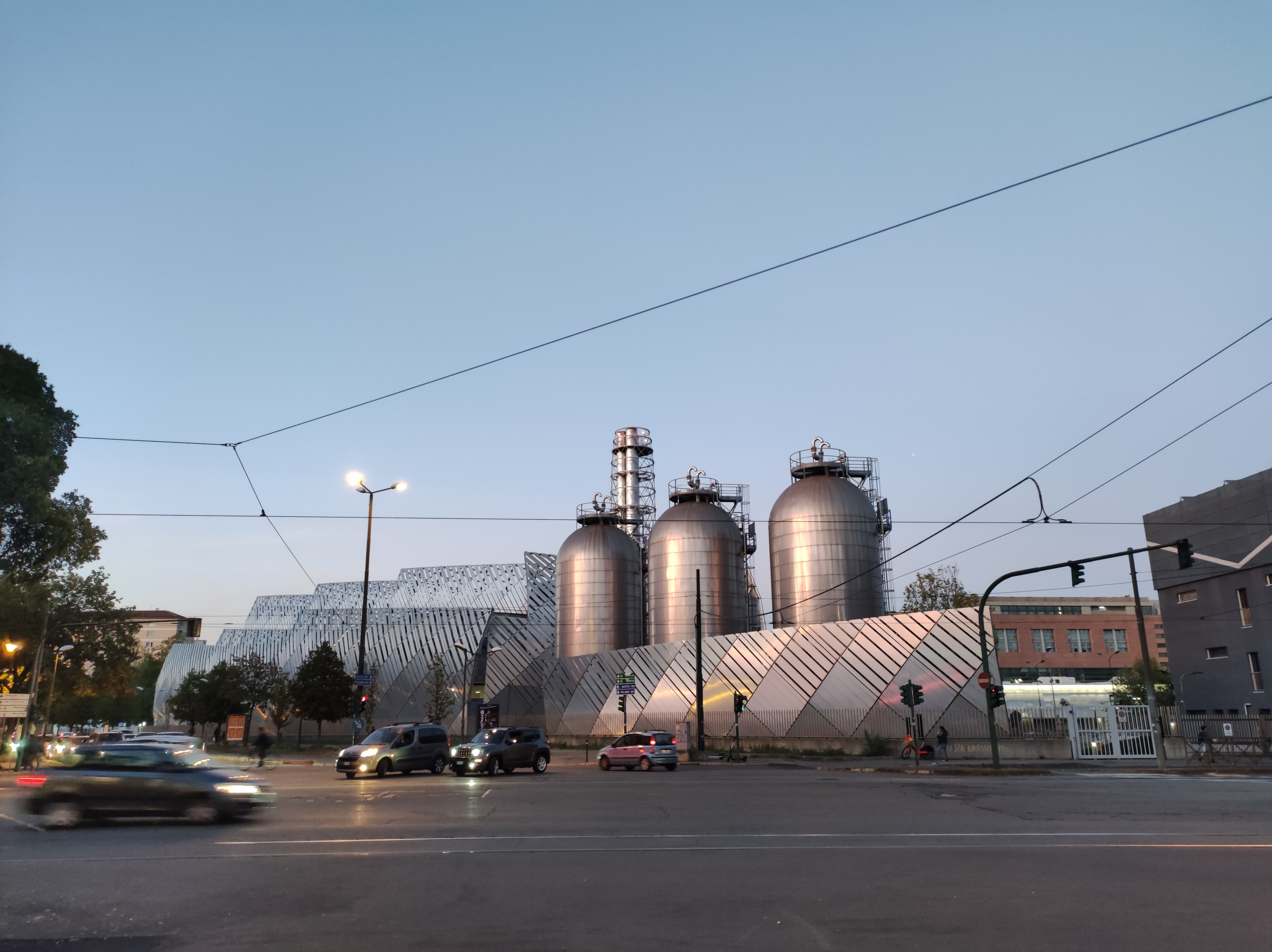
A heating power plant

Bordered by Corso Castelfidardo, Corso Vittorio Emanuele II, Corso Trapani and Corso Peschiera, this small district is mainly significant for hosting the recent expansion of Turinese institute of technology Politecnico. The expansion was possible after under-grounding the railway under Corso Castelfidardo and the subsequent disposal of the old buildings dedicated to the train maintenance present in this area (so-called Officine Grandi Riparazioni or OGR). Politecnico expanded its facilities through two huge overpass buildings over the avenue, linked to new buildings on the west side. This cluster of buildings forms an evocative square with a unique architectural style. The main building on the west side hosts a General Motors research centre, the General Motors Global Propulsion Systems (formerly known as General Motors Powertrain Europe). Politecnico area extends until Via Boggio with further facilities hosted in the former OGR facilities. The institute plans to further build new facilities in the current parking area.

North of Politecnico facilities, the main building of the OGR former cluster, became an open space which hosts temporary exhibitions. During the hot seasons, its external spaces became a fashionable site to have a typical Italian aperitivo.

North of OGR, a former prison complex called Le Nuove is a significant example of old European prison building. The complex was built between 1857 and 1869 during the reign of Victor Emmanuel II. After being disposed of during the 1990s, the complex was changed into a museum and it is possible to visit its facilities.

An example of contemporary art is the heating plant in Corso Ferrucci, which has been covered with aluminium panels. Another building (19th century), now abandoned, is the former Westinghouse factory of train brakes situated in Via Borsellino.

The residential and business zone of the district sprawls westward, beyond the former—now demolished—customs wall (cinta daziaria), which previously separated the city from the mainly rural landscape that marked the outskirts of Turin until the late 19th century. Urban planning outside the local city gate (so-called barriera di San Paolo) led to the construction of an industrial and working-class neighbourhood in the early 20th century, although factories have long been discontinued, torn down or converted to other uses nowadays. Together with San Paolo district, Cenisia hosts an extensive street market along Corso Racconigi, which is locally known as the longest street market in Europe.

=== Cit Turin ===
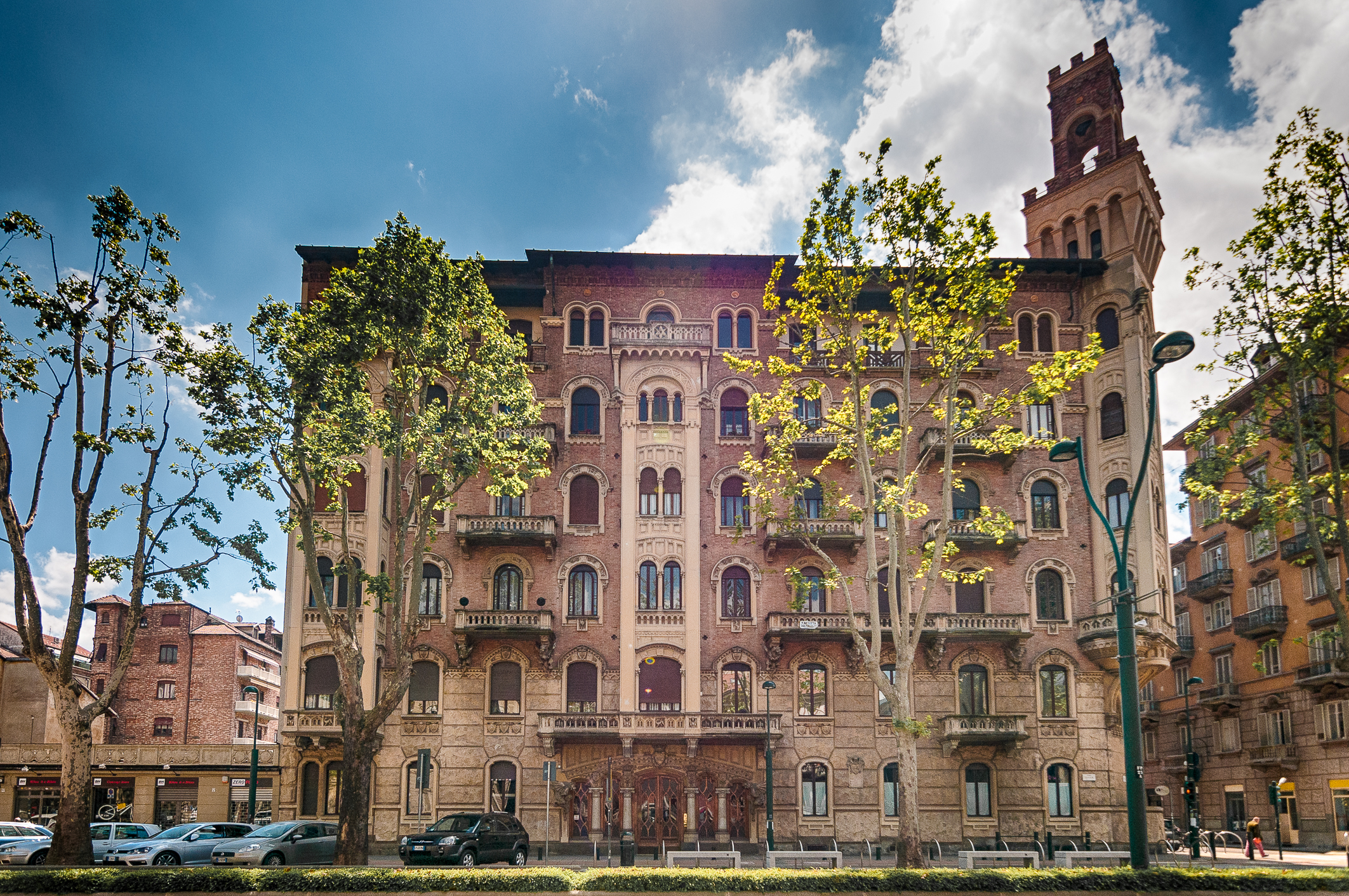
Casa della Vittoria (1918–1920) is an example of Turin's neo-gothic architecture.

The smallest district of the city is Cit Turin ('Little Turin' in Piedmontese language). This small triangle surrounded by Corso Vittorio Emanuele II, Corso Francia and Corso Inghilterra hosts some high rated residential buildings and is regarded as a prestigious residential neighbourhood by local people.

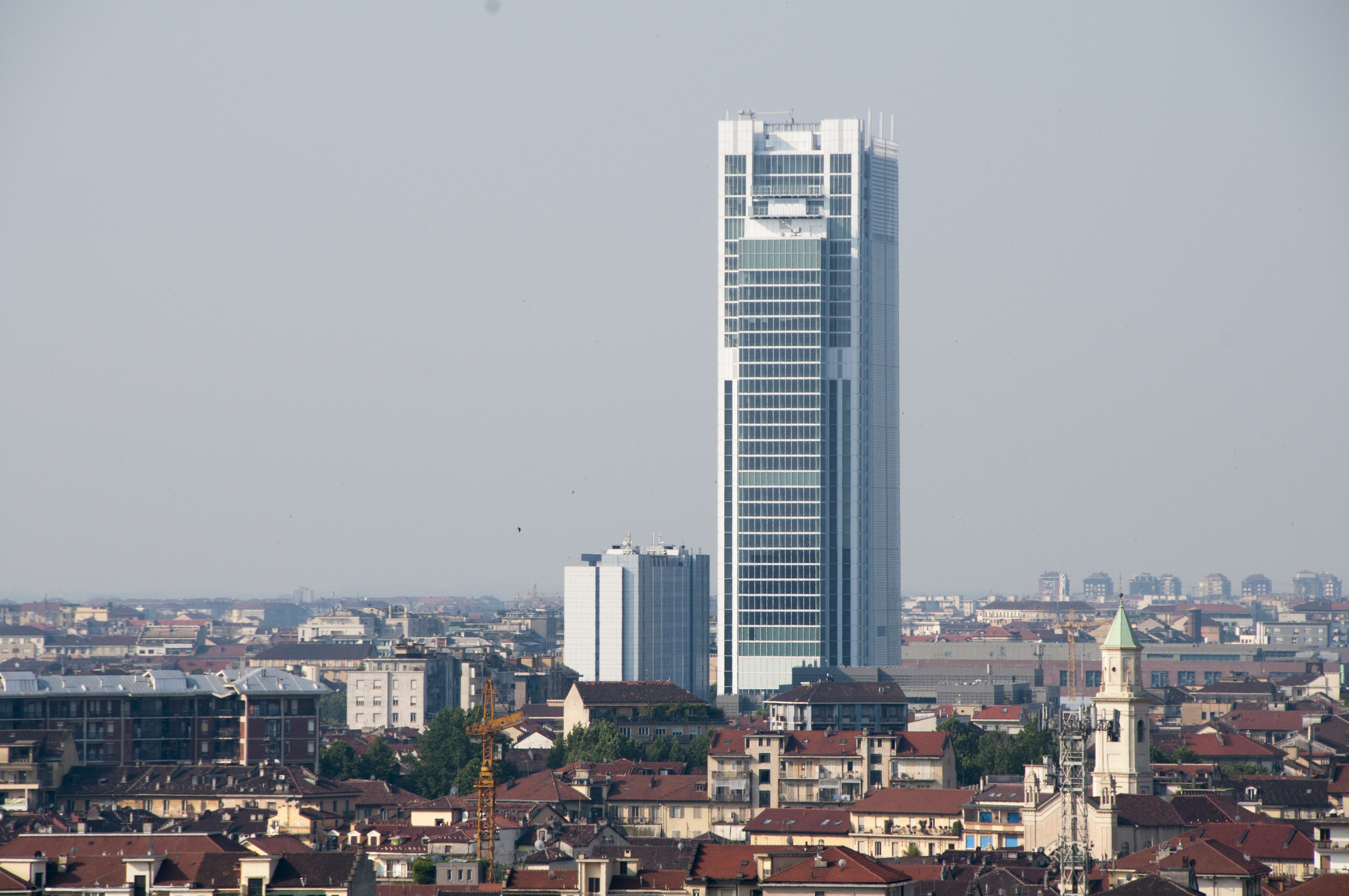
Intesa Sanpaolo banking group headquarters

The district features many buildings in Art Nouveau, Art Deco and Neo-Gothic style. Among them, one of the most impressive and well known is the Casa della Vittoria (architect Gottardo Gussoni). Another notable example is Casa Fenoglio-Lafleur. Both buildings face Corso Francia.

The district is well known for its commercial vocation mainly in its two main streets, Via Duchessa Jolanda and Via Principi d'Acaja, ideally crossing each other among the gardens Giardino Luigi Martini, locally called Piazza Benefica, which hosts a popular open market.

The district is also characterised by two massive recent buildings: the Palazzo di Giustizia, Turin's new courthouse built in the 1990s (in a 350-metre-long facility), and the first real skyscraper of Turin, the Torre Intesa Sanpaolo, which house the headquarters of one of the major Italian private banks.

=== San Donato ===
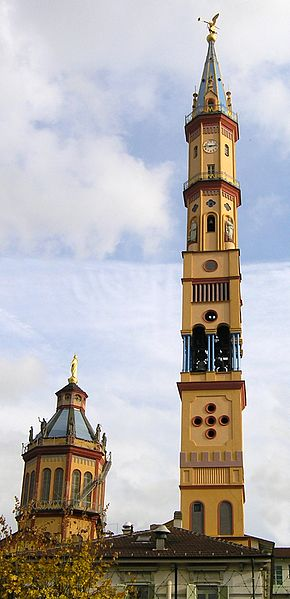
Chiesa di Nostra Signora del Suffragio e Santa Zita

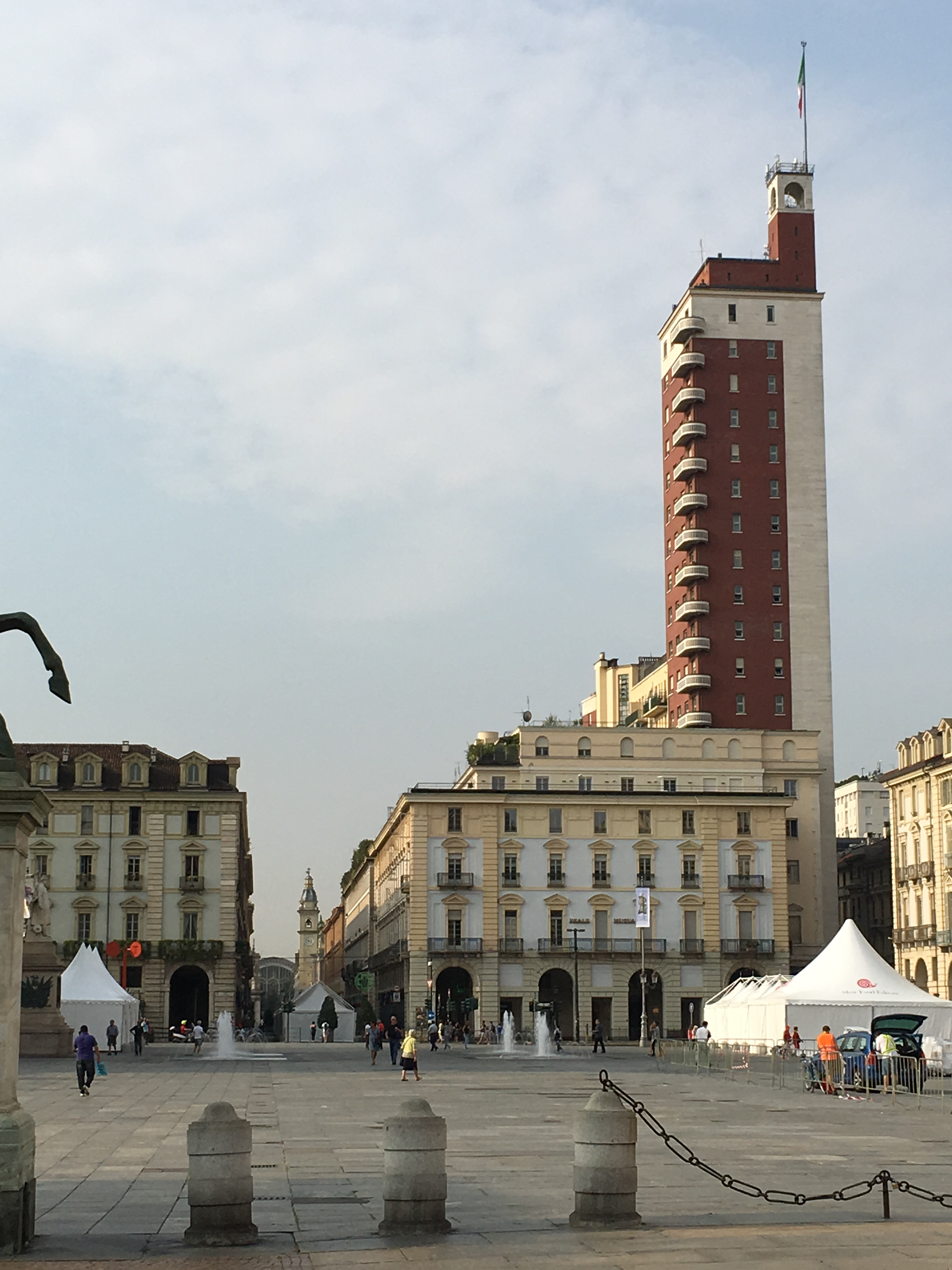
The Torre Littoria

San Donato district is between Corso Francia, Corso Lecce, Corso Potenza, Via Nole, the Parco Dora and Corso Principe Oddone. It was populated since the medieval era, but becomes bigger during the 19th century, prospering around the canal Canale di San Donato, which does not exist anymore, currently replaced by the central street of the district, Via San Donato. Buildings in the district are relatively recent (around 1820), except for the oldest group of small houses in the Brusachœr neighbourhood (Palazzo Forneris building) along Via Pacinotti near the small Piazza Paravia. The conservation of the street and of this old building influences the straightness of Via San Donato, which makes a slight curve to result in parallel with Via Pacinotti before ending in central Piazza Statuto square.

Main church of the district is the Chiesa di Nostra Signora del Suffragio e Santa Zita, which with its 83 m (272 ft) height of its bell tower, is well known to be the fifth tallest structure in the city of Turin, after the Mole Antonelliana, the Intesa-Sanpaolo skyscraper, the Torre Littoria and the two pennons of the Juventus Stadium. The church is hosting the Istituto Suore Minime di Nostra Signora del Suffragio and it was promoted and designed by Francesco Faà di Bruno. The legend says, that he wanted to build the tallest bell tower of the town and put a clock on the top, to all the poor people to know the time for free. The small building near the church is what remains of Casa Tartaglino, a small residential building which was also extended and modified by Faa di Bruno.

Villino Cibrario in Via Saccarelli is another significant building designed by Barnaba Panizza in 1842. The building was equipped with a large garden which was eliminated to host the street. The neighbourhood has a high concentration of historic buildings in Art Nouveau style designed by architect Pietro Fenoglio (among the others, the prestigious Villino Raby in Corso Francia 8). Other significant buildings are the Villa Boringhieri in Via San Donato, and other Art Nouveau and Neo-Gothic buildings are situated in Via Piffetti and Via Durandi.

Among the modern buildings of the district, the most significant one is, of course, the Torre BBPR Tower (which took the name from the architecture office who designed it). The building is representing the post-rationalism Italian architecture (same style of the better known Torre Velasca tower in the city of Milan). The tower is facing the central Piazza Statuto square. The district is crossed by some significant avenues: on Corso Svizzera, which crosses the district from north to south, faces the Business Centre Piero Della Francesca, where the offices of Tuttosport, one of the three national sports daily newspapers has its head offices. Also on Corso Svizzera, stands one of the oldest hospitals of the city, the Ospedale Amedeo di Savoia, specialised in infectious diseases. Other major avenues are Corso Umbria and Corso Tassoni.

Another big avenue, which borders the district on its East, is Corso Principe Oddone, which in the past was along the railway to Milan. Currently the railway has been under-grounded: the avenue will be enlarged and have same architecture style of southern Corso Inghilterra in downtown, becoming one of the major avenues of Turin. The northern part of the district was part of the former industrial district of Turin, recently reconverted to a park called Parco Dora. Mainly, in San Donato the portion reconverted was the one occupied by the plant of Michelin (west of Via Livorno) and Fiat ironwork plants (on the East). Differently for other portions of Parco Dora, this part has been totally reconverted to park without letting any evidence of the industrial area except for the cooling tower which stands along Corso Umbria and became a symbol of the park. Works are completed in the western area, where Corso Mortara has been closed to traffic and moved just a bit northern and covered by an artificial tunnel. It is possible to access the southern shore of the River Dora. South of the park, an interesting architecture of different levels is hosting a new shopping mall called Centro Commerciale Parco Dora. East of Via Livorno, works are still partially in progress, with the River Dora still to be uncovered by a big slab, on which the Fiat plants used to stand). West of Via Livorno, the Environment Park is a research centre for renewable energy.

=== Aurora ===
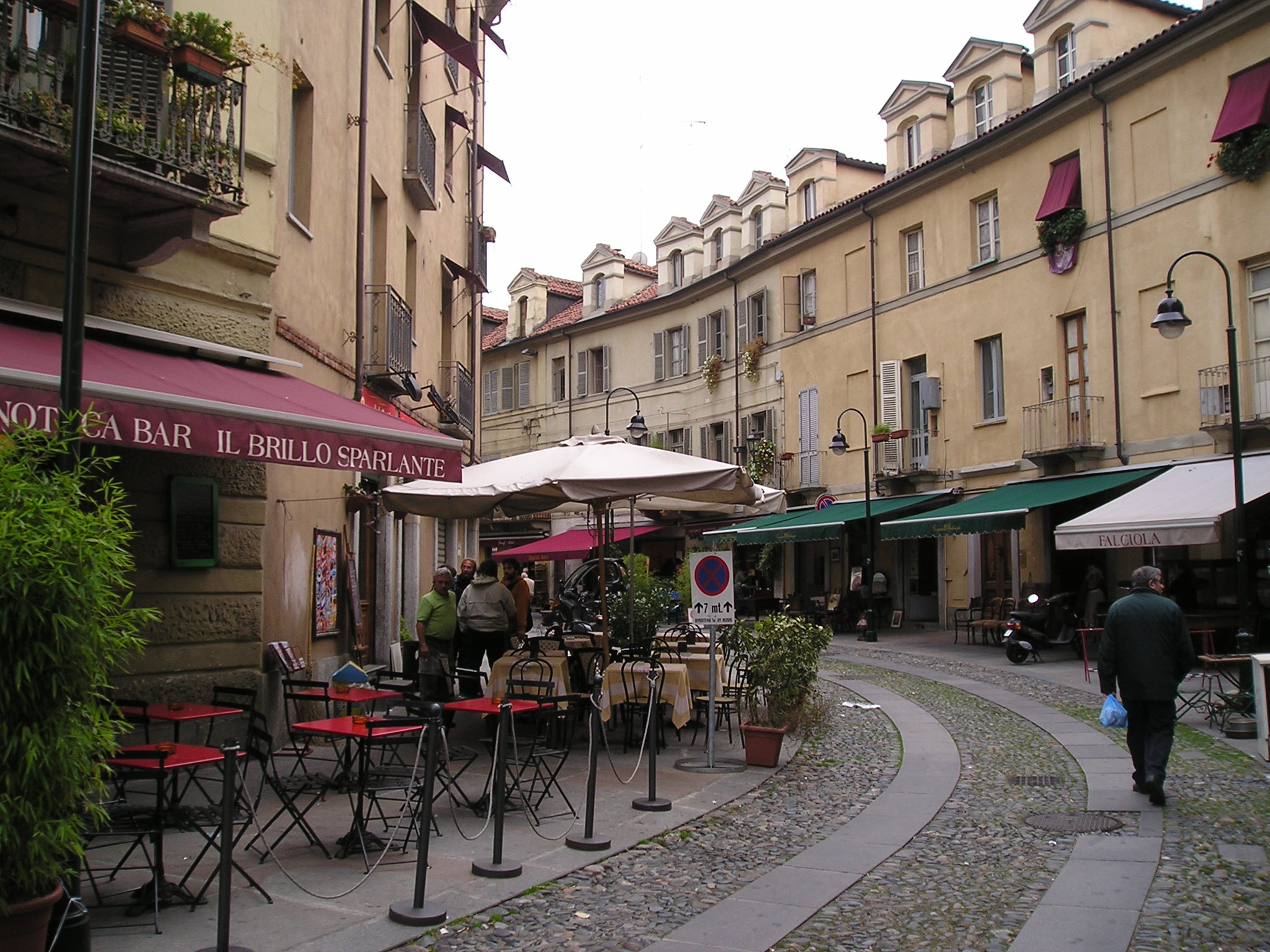
Tiny streets of Borgo Dora

Aurora is one of the most ancient districts which developed out of the medieval city walls, north of the historical city centre. It stretches from downtown northern boundaries in Corso Regina Margherita (an extended and important thoroughfare of Turin) up to Corso Vigevano and Corso Novara in the North Side (namely the old excise boundary until the early 20th century); the western boundary is Corso Principe Oddone (now part of the Spina Centrale boulevard) and the eastern border is the River Dora.

The district was named Aurora after the so-called Cascina Aurora, an old farmstead lying north of the River Dora, right at the intersection between Corso Giulio Cesare and Corso Emilia. The farmstead has long been demolished and the area has been converted to office buildings, hosting the Turinese textile company Gruppo Finanziario Tessile (GFT) headquarters until the early 21st century.

The historical hub of the district is Borgo Dora (The 'Dora Borough'), a small neighbourhood next to Porta Palazzo and enclosed by Corso Regina Margherita, Via Cigna, the River Dora and Corso Giulio Cesare. Once known as Borgo del Pallone ('Ball Borough') or Balon in Piedmontese dialect (locally [baˈlun]), this neighbourhood is known for its mercatino del Balon or simply Balon, the Turinese flea market that opens every Saturday in its tiny and twisted streets. Borgo Dora hosts several places, such as: Piccola Casa della Divina Provvidenza ('Little House of the Divine Providence'), also known as Cottolengo, a charitable organisation which has been operating for almost 200 years in the city; Arsenale della Pace ('Arsenal of Peace'), a former weapons factory that currently hosts the headquarters of SERMIG (Servizio Missionario Giovani), a nonprofit association which assists poor and homeless people; Caserma Cavalli ('Cavalli Barracks'), a former barracks topped by a clock tower which now hosts Scuola Holden, a storytelling and performing arts school; the Cortile del Maglio ('Mallet Courtyard'), a covered pedestrian area featuring bars and clubs. Across from Cortile del Maglio and Arsenale della Pace stands a wide pedestrian area which features a hot air balloon, a clear allusion to the neighbourhood's old name Balon: recently installed, the balloon is open to public which can now take a view of the city from this new high observation point.

Right at the borders of Borgo Dora stands part of Porta Palazzo open market which hosts the New Exhibition Hall, designed by the Italian architect Massimiliano Fuksas. The building has replaced the Clothes Market, one of the four covered pavilions of Porta Palazzo market; however, this glass green-shaded building has been highly criticised because of its lack of usability for commercial activities, albeit an example of contemporary architecture.

Another interesting building at the borders of the neighbourhood is Porta Milano (a.k.a. stazione della Ciriè-Lanzo), a former 19th-century railway station that marked the terminus of Ciriè-Lanzo railway line until the 1980s. To this day, the station is no longer in use as well as the rails up to Piazza Baldissera. The station building was recently renovated and now hosts some old locomotives, although it is not open to the public. The old rails crossing the district are disused.

Borgo Dora, as many other pockets of Aurora, is characterised by the marked multi-ethnicity of its population, being home to a large community of immigrants from emerging countries.

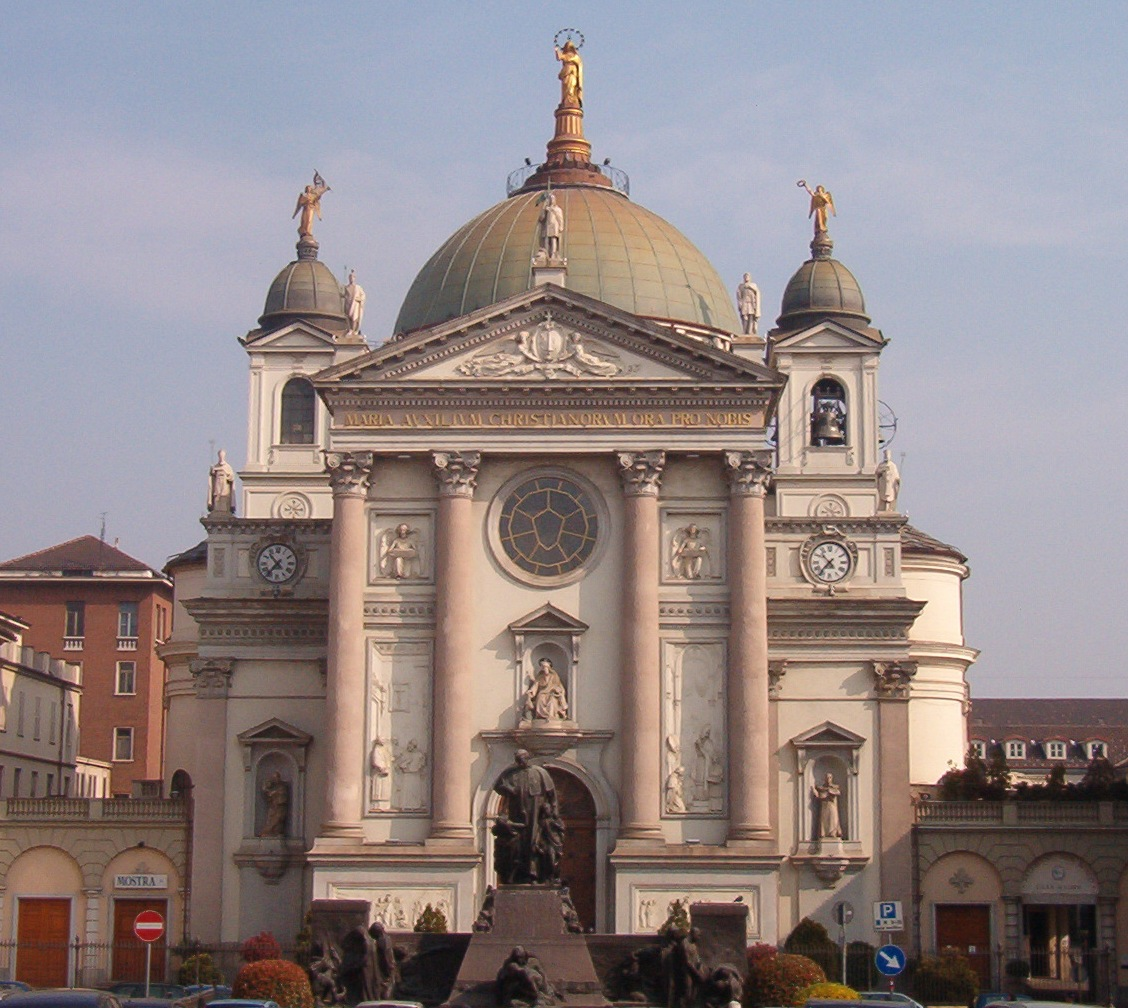
Santuario di Maria Ausiliatrice

West of Borgo Dora stands Rione Valdocco ('Valdocco neighbourhood'), enclosed by Via Cigna, Corso Regina Margherita, Corso Principe Oddone and the River Dora. This neighbourhood hosts the significant architecture of Santuario di Maria Ausiliatrice ('Maria Ausiliatrice Sanctuary') in the homonymous square and behind the church stands San Pietro in Vincoli old cemetery.

Overall, the main thoroughfares of the West side of Aurora are Via Cigna, which crosses the district from north to south, Corso Vercelli, a historical avenue starting north of the River Dora, and Corso Principe Oddone, part of the long Spina Centrale boulevard that will be built over the underground Turin-Milan railway. However, the Spina Centrale project is proceeding slowly because of the lack of funds and the boulevard is still occupied by a large worksite along its span. Once completed, Aurora district will be connected to Eastern San Donato, thanks to a better connection among the roads of the two adjacent districts (i.e. Corso Ciriè will continue in Corso Gamba and Strada del Fortino in Corso Rosai).

As for the rest of Aurora, the district is crossed by an important thoroughfare named Corso Giulio Cesare, a long boulevard that extends from Porta Palazzo up to Turin-Trieste motorway entrance in the northern urban fringe of Turin. Other significant roads are Corso Palermo, Via Bologna and Corso Regio Parco, mostly in the East side of Aurora which is known as Borgo Rossini ('Rossini Borough'). Albeit not a road, the River Dora is also a significant element for the whole district, since it completely crosses it from West to East.

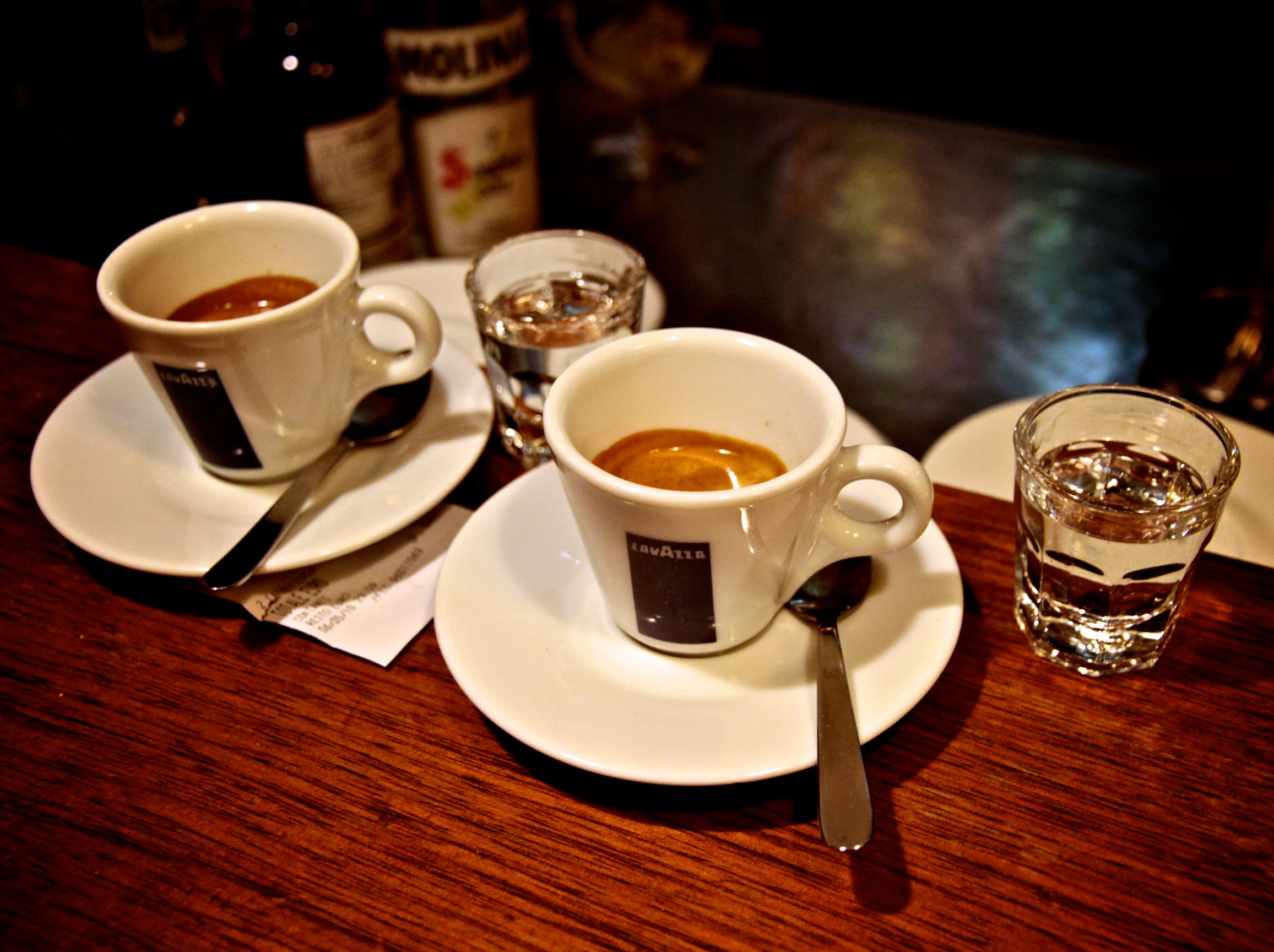
Lavazza, famous Turin coffee brand

The area north of the river features a mix of old residential buildings and remains of former factories and facilities from the 20th century. An example are the remains of Fiat Officine Grandi Motori (OGM) in Corso Vigevano, an old factory that produced big industrial and automotive Diesel engines, a sort of symbol of the industrial history of Turin. Another disused facility is Astanteria Martini ('Martini Emergency Department') in Via Cigna, a former emergency department from the 1920s which has been lying vacant since long.

As for the old residential buildings of the area, this part of Aurora hosts the oldest public housing block of the city, built by Istituto Autonomo Case Popolari (IACP) in 1908 in lieu of an old dilapidated small farm once known as Chiabotto delle Merle.

Despite its run-down look, the famous Lavazza coffee company, along with IAAD School of Design, chose this part of the city as the location for their new headquarters, which will be built in a contemporary building dubbed Nuvola ('Cloud') right at the borders of Borgo Rossini. Designed by the architect Gino Zucchi, this project is still a work in progress but excavations in the area revealed the remains of a medieval cemetery and an early Christian basilica; these findings will be preserved and will be shown to the public.

Borgo Rossini hosts a number of businesses, for instance, the Robe di Kappa flagship store (Kappa is a noted Italian sportswear brand founded in Turin) and the Cineporto ('Cineport') a.k.a. La Casa dei Produttori ('The Filmmakers' House', which hosts the Turin Piedmont Film Commission Foundation).

=== Vanchiglia ===
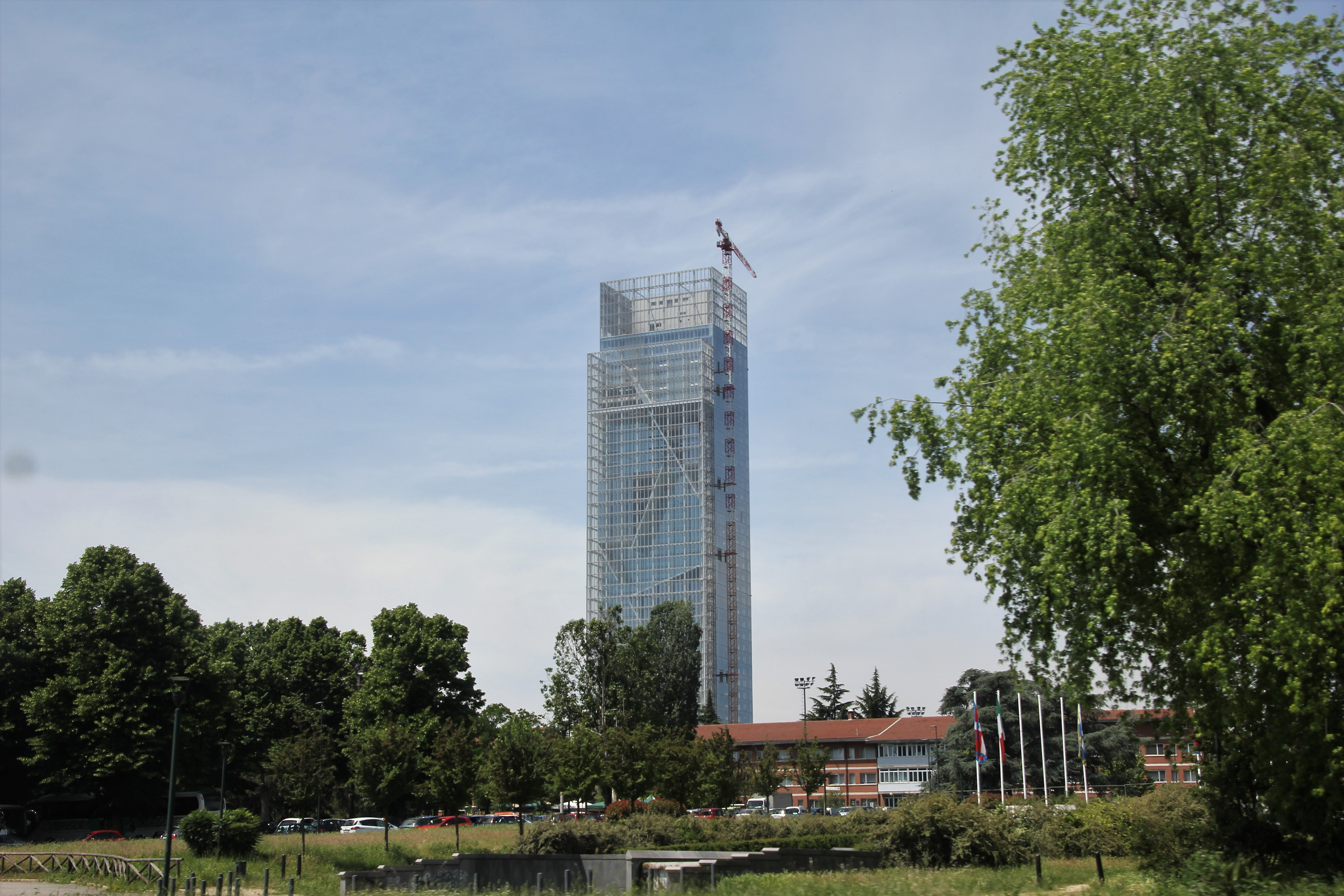
Piedmont Region Headquarters (209 m; 686 ft), one of the tallest skyscrapers in Italy

Vanchiglia is bordered by Corso San Maurizio, Corso Regio Parco and the River Po, crossed also by the River Dora Riparia and by two big avenues, Corso Regina Margherita and Corso Tortona.

Borgo Vanchiglia is the historical district: a little triangle next to downtown, situated between Corso San Maurizio, Corso Regina Margherita and the River Po. The district is quite popular nowadays because being quite closer to the heart of Turin nightlife Piazza Vittorio Veneto, many bars and restaurants opened recently in this area. However, Vanchiglia also includes the area called Vanchiglietta, north of Borgo Vanchiglia.

Notable church in Borgo Vanchiglia is the French neo-Gothic Chiesa di Santa Giulia situated into Piazza Santa Giulia.

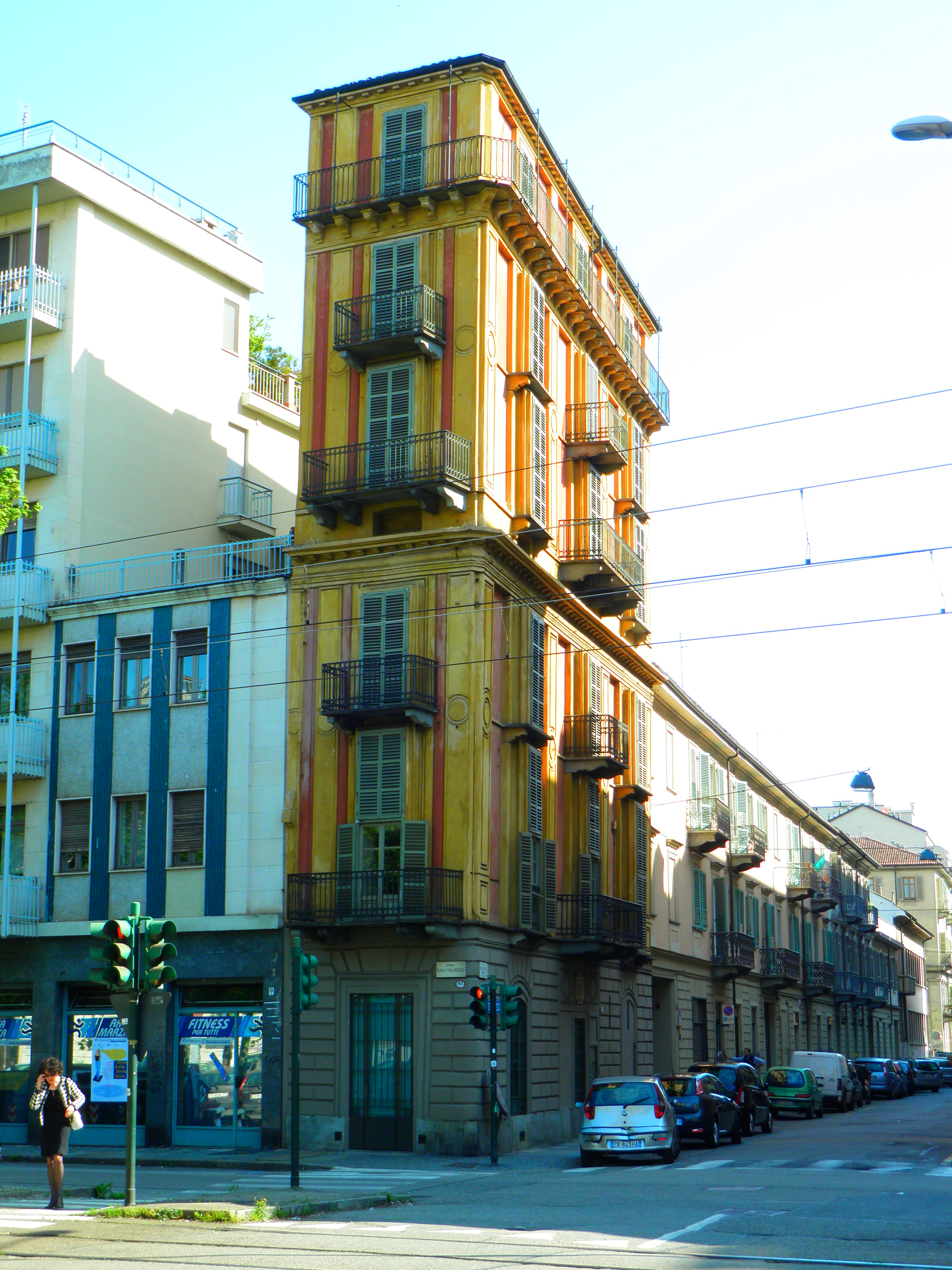
Fetta Di Polenta, northern side

A notable and unusual building in the area is the so-called "Fetta di Polenta" (lit. 'polenta slice'), formerly known as Casa Scaccabarozzi. This building is where Corso San Maurizio meets Via Giulia di Barolo, and it is one of the most peculiar examples of Turin architecture: a thin trapezoid 27 m (89 ft) wide on Via Giulia Di Barolo, 5 m (16 ft) on Corso San Maurizio and just 0.70 m (2 ft 4 in) wide on the opposite end. It was designed in 1840 by Alessandro Antonelli for his wife, Francesca Scaccabarozzi. The curious name comes from the shape of the palace, which resembles a "slice of polenta", and also because it is painted with an ochre colour.

In the surroundings, in Via Vanchiglia 8 (although in downtown and not really in Vanchiglia anymore), there is another trapezoid house, albeit with less extreme design: similarly, this building is nicknamed "Fetta di Formaggio" (lit. 'cheese slice'), built in 1832 for the rich Marchese Birago di Vische by the architect Antonio Talentino.

Other notable buildings are the town public baths, eclectic building built in 1905 (Corso Regina Margherita crossing Via Vanchiglia), and theTeatro della Caduta theatre, opened in 2003 in Via Michele Buniva 23, which with its 45 seats is the smallest theatre in Turin and among the smallest theatres in Europe.

In Corso Regina Margherita, another notable building is the former Opera pia Reynero, a charitable organisation. The building was built in 1892. Being abandoned for a long time after it closed in 1996, it was then occupied by the Askatasuna Social Center, a non-profit anarchic organisation, hosting since then various activities such as concerts, dinners, seminars and homeless solidarity initiatives.

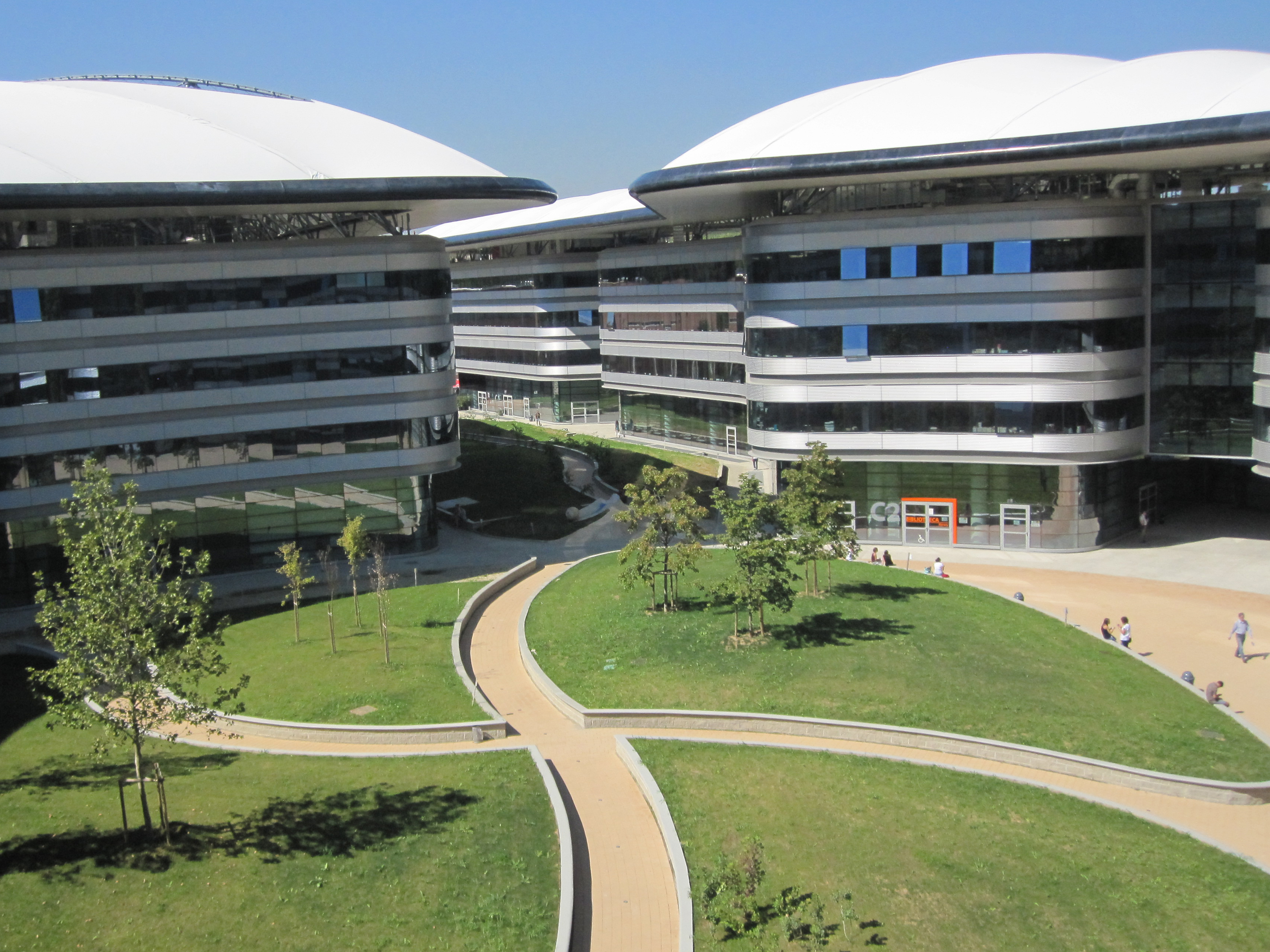
Campus Luigi Einaudi

North of Corso Regina Margherita, district is losing the flavour and architecture typical of Turin downtown, cause a significant portion of the district was formerly occupied by factories, nowadays partially abandoned or replaced by modern buildings. A significant example was the area occupied by gas companies between Corso Regina Margherita and the River Dora, which were partially demolished to make place to the new modern Faculty of Law building (Campus "Luigi Einaudi"), designed by the architect Norman Foster. This building was classified by the American television company CNN among the 10 most spectacular university buildings in the world. In the campus courtyard, a large wood statue representing a bull (symbol of Turin) has been erected by Mario Ceroli. The area hosts also a student campus.

Next to the campus, a new cycling and pedestrian bridge on the River Dora was opened on 16 April 2010, linking the campus area to Corso Verona. Parco Colletta is a big park area touched by the two rivers of the district, which also hosts some sport facilities, mainly association football fields and a swimming pool.

The district is completed by the Cimitero Monumentale cemetery. This huge complex (formerly known as Cimitero Generale) is the largest cemetery in Turin, and among the first in Italy for the number of buried people (over 400,000). It is close to the Colletta park. The ancient part of the cemetery rises from the main entrance of Corso Novara with his octagonal shape. It contains numerous historical tombs and 12 km (7.5 mi) of arcades, enriched by artistic sculptures (that's why it is called a "monumental cemetery"). Over the years there have been subsequent extensions of the central historical body in the direction of the Colletta park. In the cemetery, there is a crematory temple built in 1882, one of the largest in Italy.

=== Main churches ===
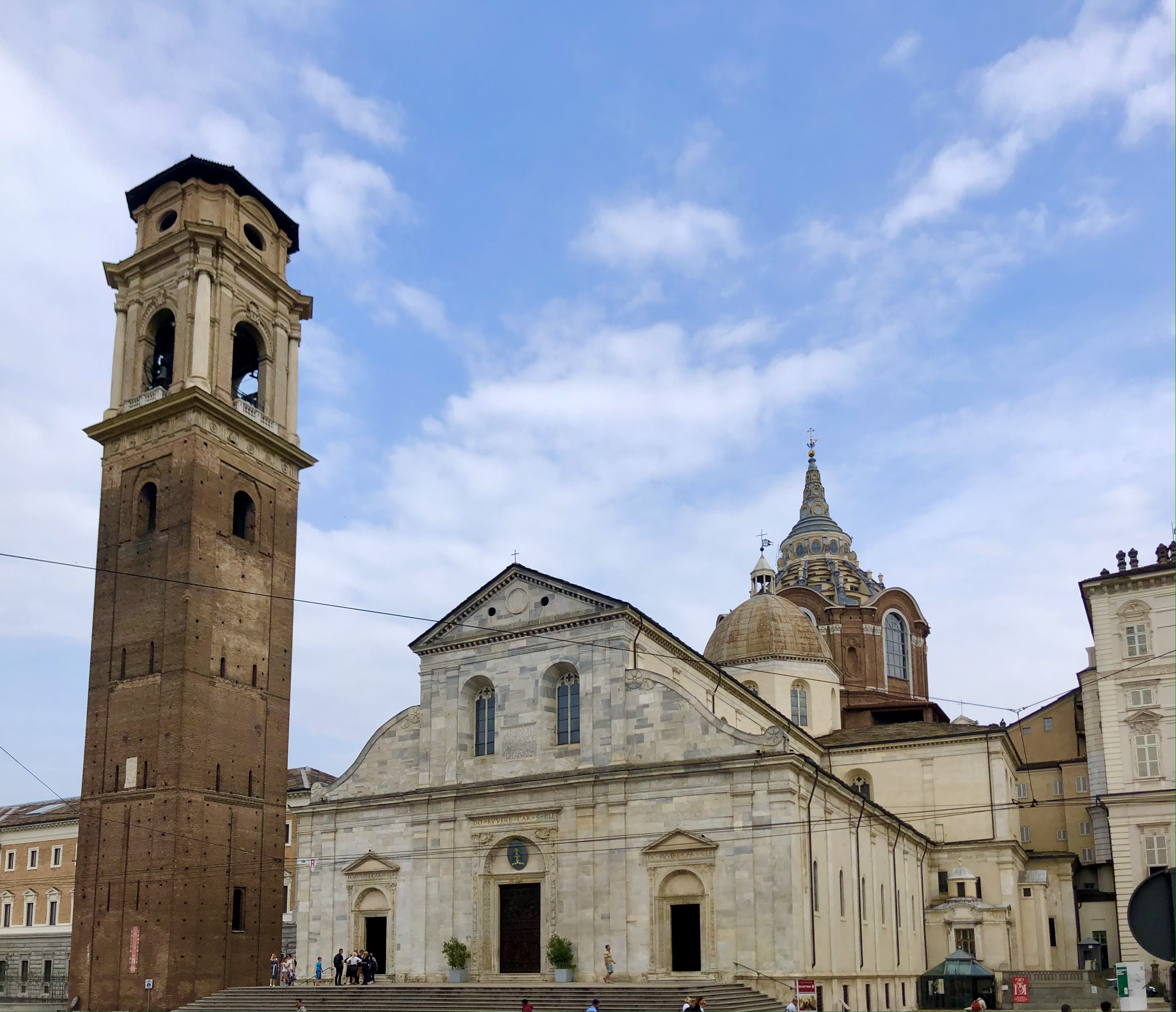
Turin Cathedral featuring the Chapel of the Holy Shroud

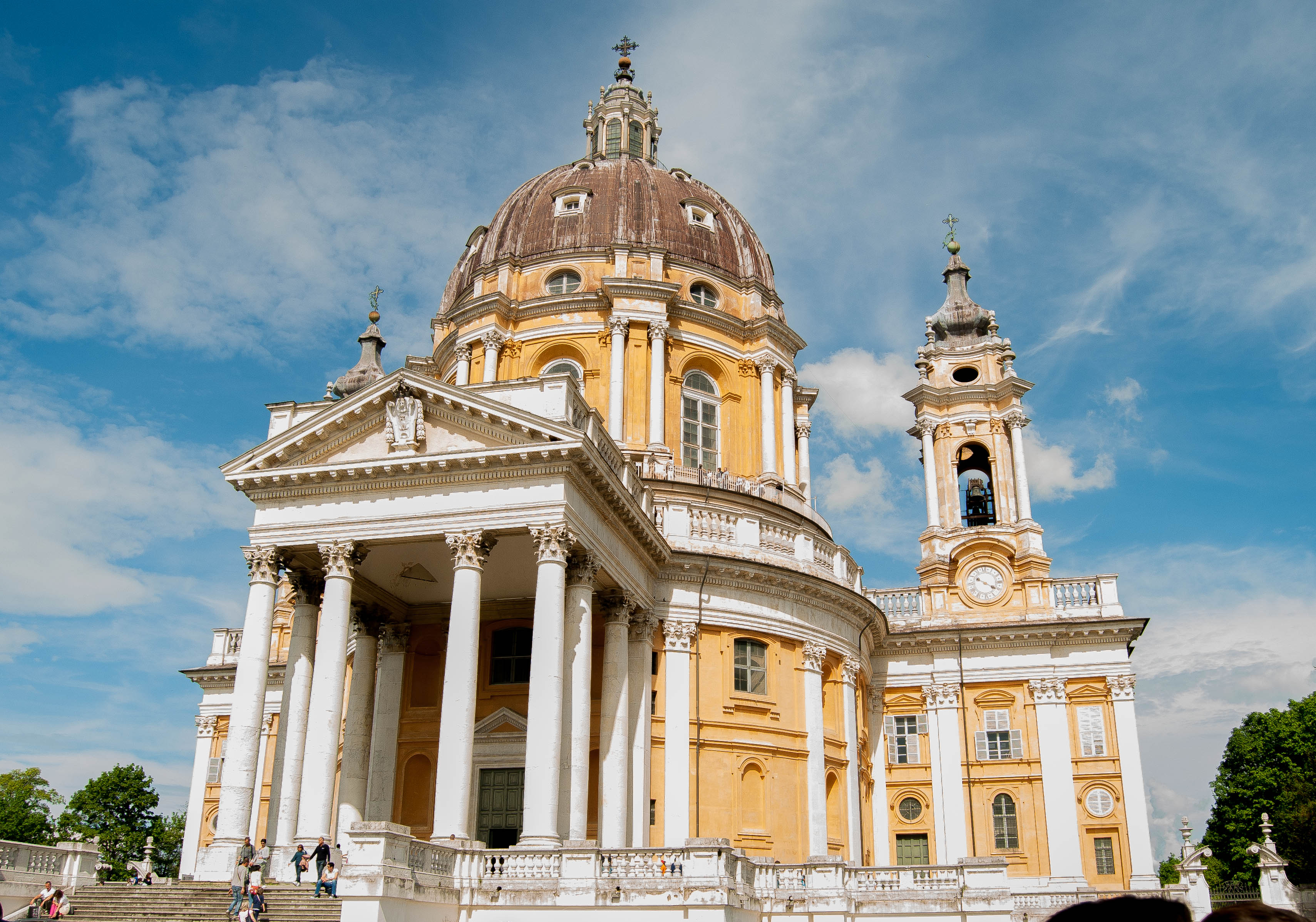
Basilica of Superga

The Santuario della Consolata, a sanctuary much frequented by pilgrims, stands on the site of the 10th-century Monastery of St. Andrew, and is a work by Guarini. It was sumptuously restored in 1903. Outside the city are: the Basilica of Our Lady, Help of Christians built by St. John Bosco, the Gran Madre built in 1818 on occasion of the return of King Victor Emmanuel I of Sardinia and Santa Maria del Monte (1583) on Monte dei Cappuccini.

In the hills overlooking the city, the Basilica of Superga provides a view of Turin against a backdrop of the snow-capped Alps. The basilica holds the tombs of many of the dukes of Savoy, as well as many of the kings of Sardinia. Superga can be reached by means of the Superga Rack Railway from Sassi suburb. The Basilica of Superga was built by Amadeus II of Savoy as an ex-voto for the liberation of Turin (1706), and served as a royal mausoleum since 1772.

=== Villas, parks and gardens ===
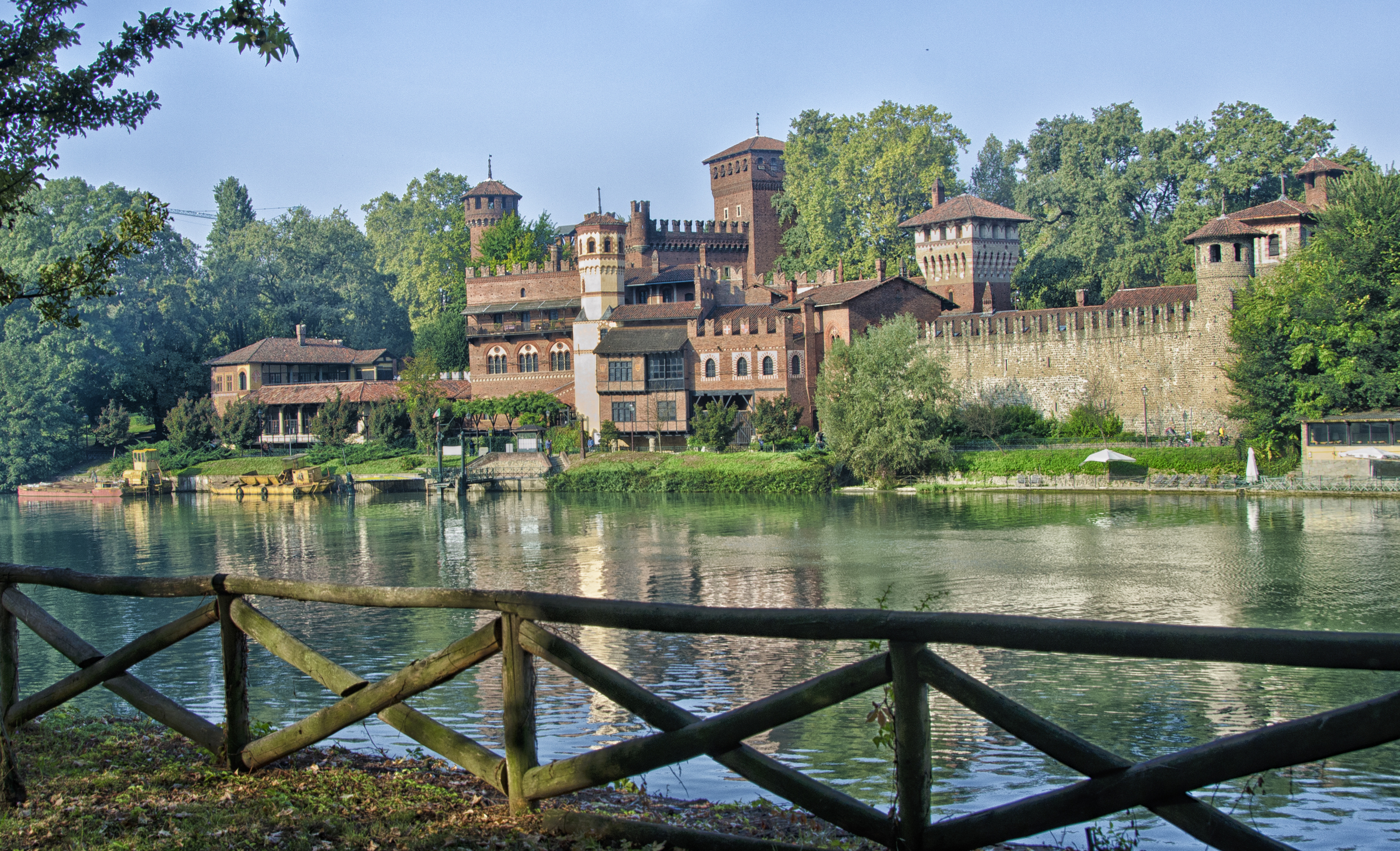
The medieval village in Valentino Park

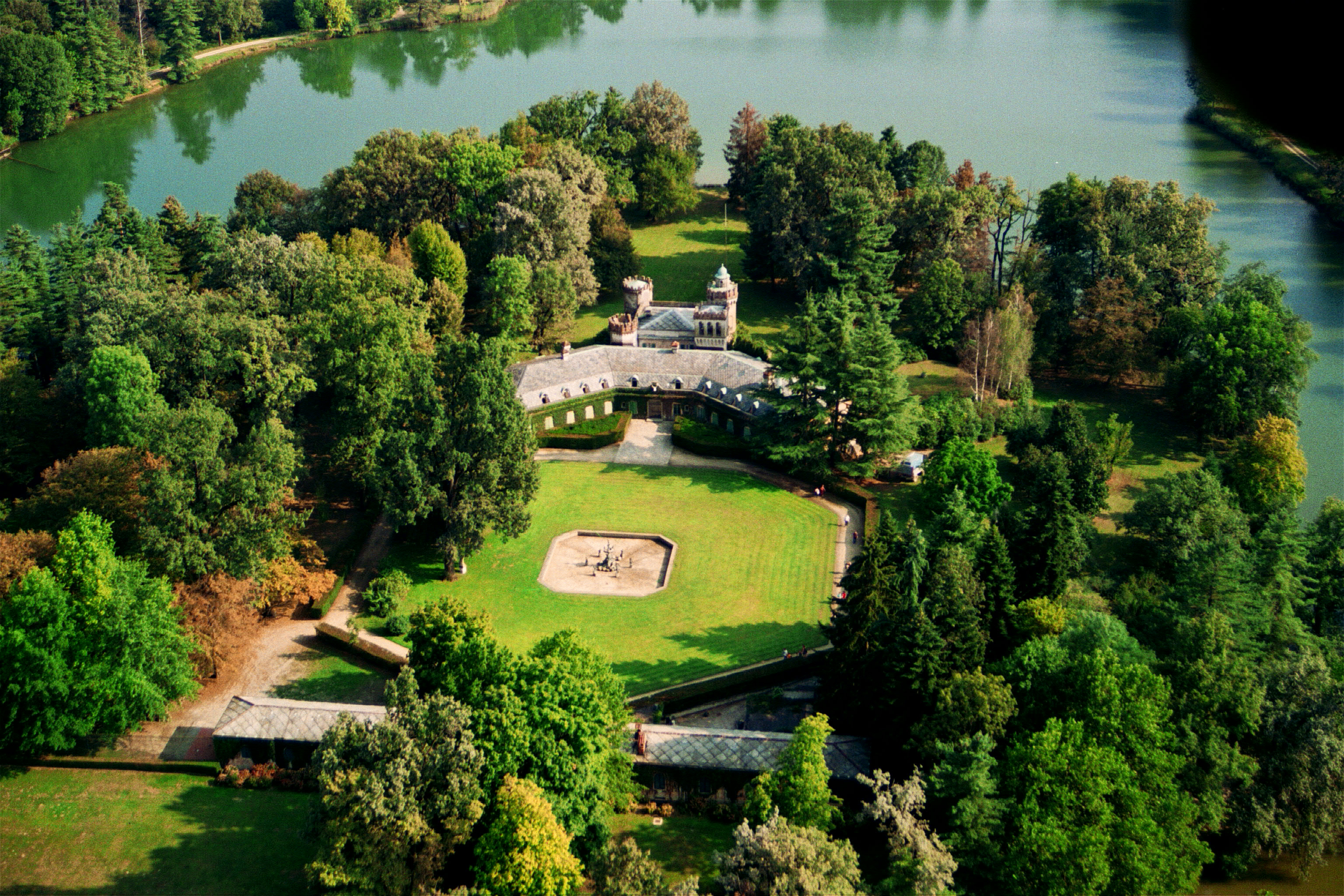
La Mandria Regional Park

The most popular park in the city is Parco del Valentino. In 1961, during the celebrations of Italia61 (Italian unification centenary), an important international exhibition (FLOR61: Flowers of the world in Turin) took place in the park with 800 exhibitors from 19 countries. For the occasion the plan for the new lighting of the park, along with its fountains and paths, was assigned to Guido Chiarelli, the head engineer at the city hall.

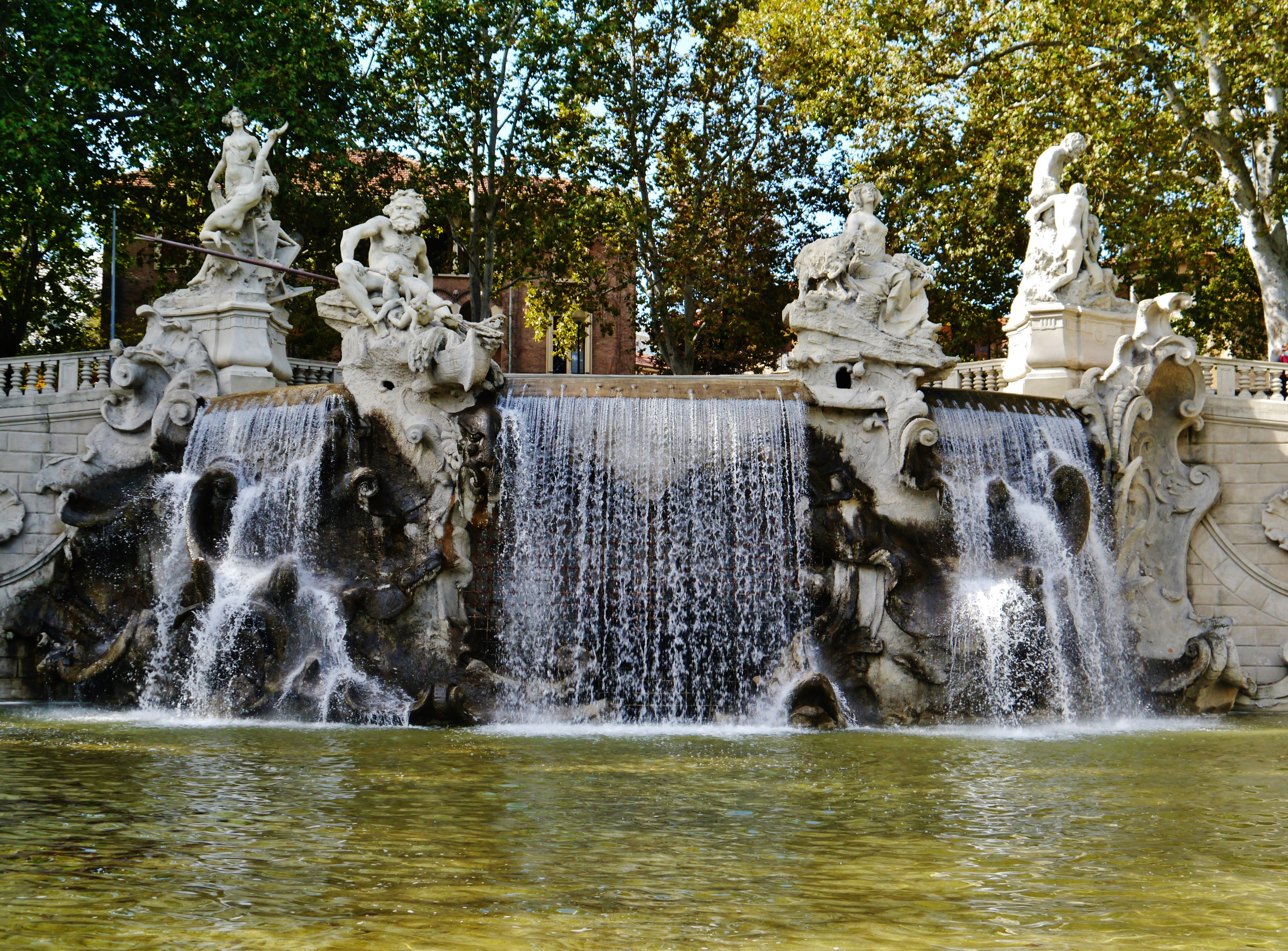
Fontana dei dodici mesi inside Parco del Valentino

Other large parks are Parco della Pellerina, Parco Colletta, Parco Rignon, Parco Colonnetti and the University botanical gardens. Around the city are several other parks such as La Mandria Regional Park and the Parco della Palazzina di Caccia di Stupinigi, once hunting grounds of the Savoy, and those on the hills of Turin. Many parks are smaller, in the various districts: there is also a total of 240 playgrounds in these parks. In the early 1960s, mayor Amedeo Peyron had the first garden in Italy with games for children inaugurated. According to a Legambiente report from 2007, Turin is the first Italian city as far as structures and policies on childcare are concerned. One of the most famous parks featuring a children's playground is Parco della Tesoriera, which is also home to Andrea della Corte Municipal Music Library; this facility is housed in Villa Tesoriera, built in 1715 and once the Royal Treasurer's residence. The park is in the Parella suburb (Turin's West Side) and hosts many concerts in summer.

Rosa Vercellana, commonly known as Rosina and, in Piedmontese as La Bela Rosin ('The Beautiful Rosin'), was the mistress and later wife of King Victor Emmanuel II. She was made Countess of Mirafiori and Fontanafredda, but never Queen of Italy. As the Savoy family refused to allow her to be buried next to her husband in the Pantheon, her children had a mausoleum built for her in a similar form and on a smaller scale in Turin, next to the road to the Castello di Mirafiori. The circular copper-domed neoclassical monument, surmounted by a Latin cross and surrounded by a large park, was designed by Angelo Dimezzi and completed in 1888.

== Economy ==
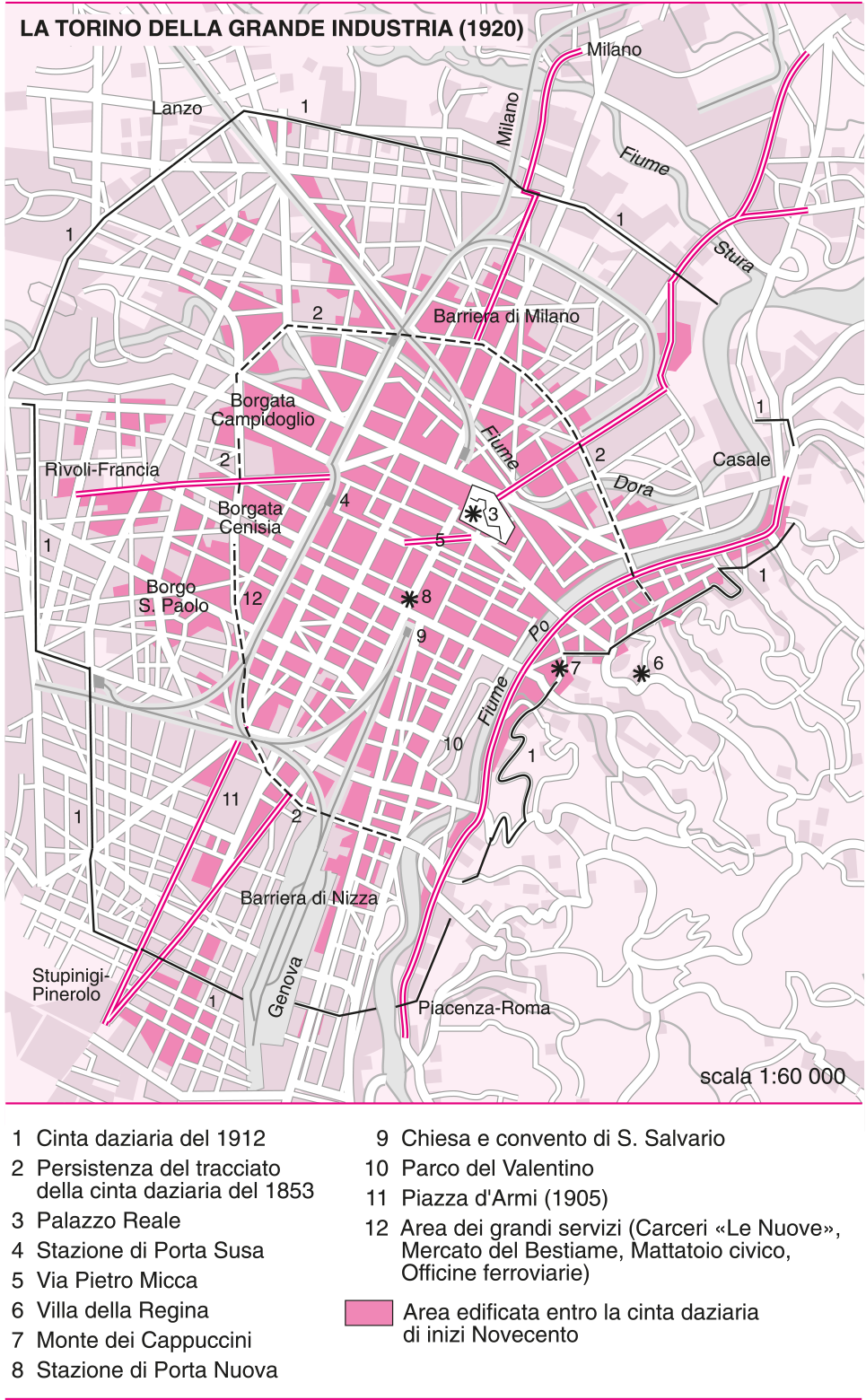
Map of industrial Turin

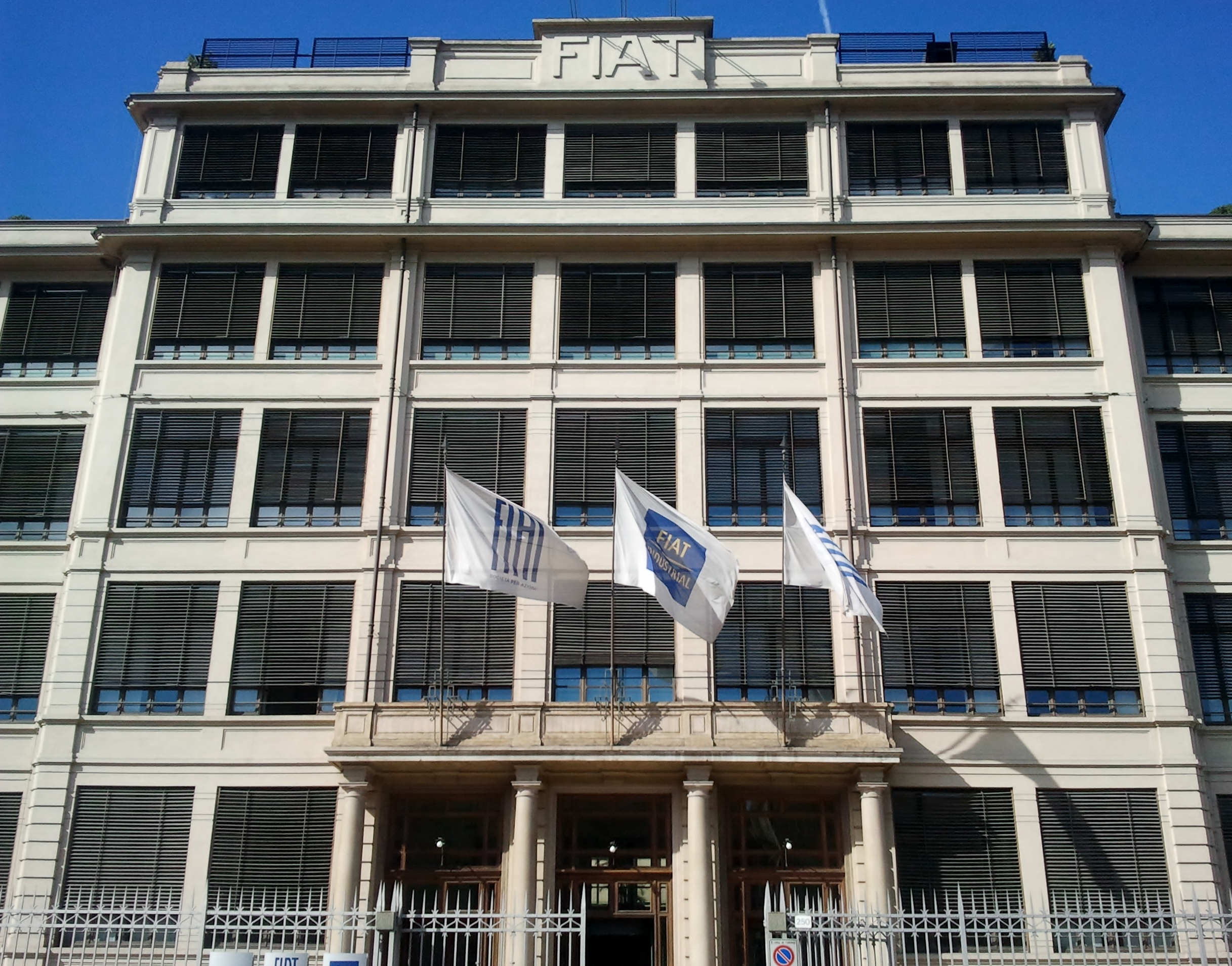
The Lingotto building in Via Nizza was once the world headquarters of Fiat

Turin developed as a Fordist city in the early 20th century, which meant a shift from a service-based economy to an industry-based one. In the vein of many Fordist economies Turin's economy relies heavily upon its automotive and aerospace industries. Despite the general decline of the automotive industry since the oil crisis of 1973, the city still relies heavily upon its automotive industry. Since before the Second World War, the automotive industry has been the largest employer in the city, and almost all exports from Turin are manufactured goods. The city serves as the headquarters to Fiat (Fabbrica Italiana Automobili Torino; Turin Italian Automobiles Factory), which has since been absorbed by its parent company, the Fiat Chrysler Automobiles group (now Stellantis) headquartered in Amsterdam, the eighth largest automotive company in the world. Turin is still home to a sizeable Fiat factory.

From the 1980s, Turin diversified its economy and is shifting back towards a service economy. Tech and innovation industries are booming in Turin, which was ranked third in number of innovative startups and firms in the information-tech sector, and has some of the most patent applications to the European Patent Office of any city. In 2008 the city generated a GDP of $68 billion, ranking as the world's 78th richest city by purchasing power, and 16th in Europe, according to PricewaterhouseCoopers. Turin accounts for 8 percent of Italy's GDP. The city has been ranked in 2010 by Globalization and World Cities Research Network as a Gamma-level city.

Other companies operating in Turin are Maserati, Lancia, Alfa Romeo, Iveco, Pininfarina, Bertone, Sparco, Italdesign Giugiaro, New Holland, Comau, Magneti Marelli, Graziano Oerlikon, Ghia, Fioravanti (automotive), Rai (national broadcasting company), Banca Investis, FCA Bank, Intesa Sanpaolo, Reale Mutua (finance), Invicta, Kappa, Superga (fashion), Ferrero, Lavazza, Martini & Rossi (food & beverage), Alpitour (hospitality and tourism), TILab (ex-CSELT), and Aurora (pen manufacturer).

The city is also well known for its aerospace industry Alenia Aeronautica, Thales Alenia Space and Avio. The International Space Station modules Harmony, Columbus, Tranquility, as well as the Cupola and all MPLMs were produced in Turin. The future European launcher projects beyond Ariane 5 will also be managed from Turin by the new NGL company, a subsidiary of EADS (70%) and Aircraft Division of Leonardo (30%).

== Culture ==
=== Visual art and museums ===
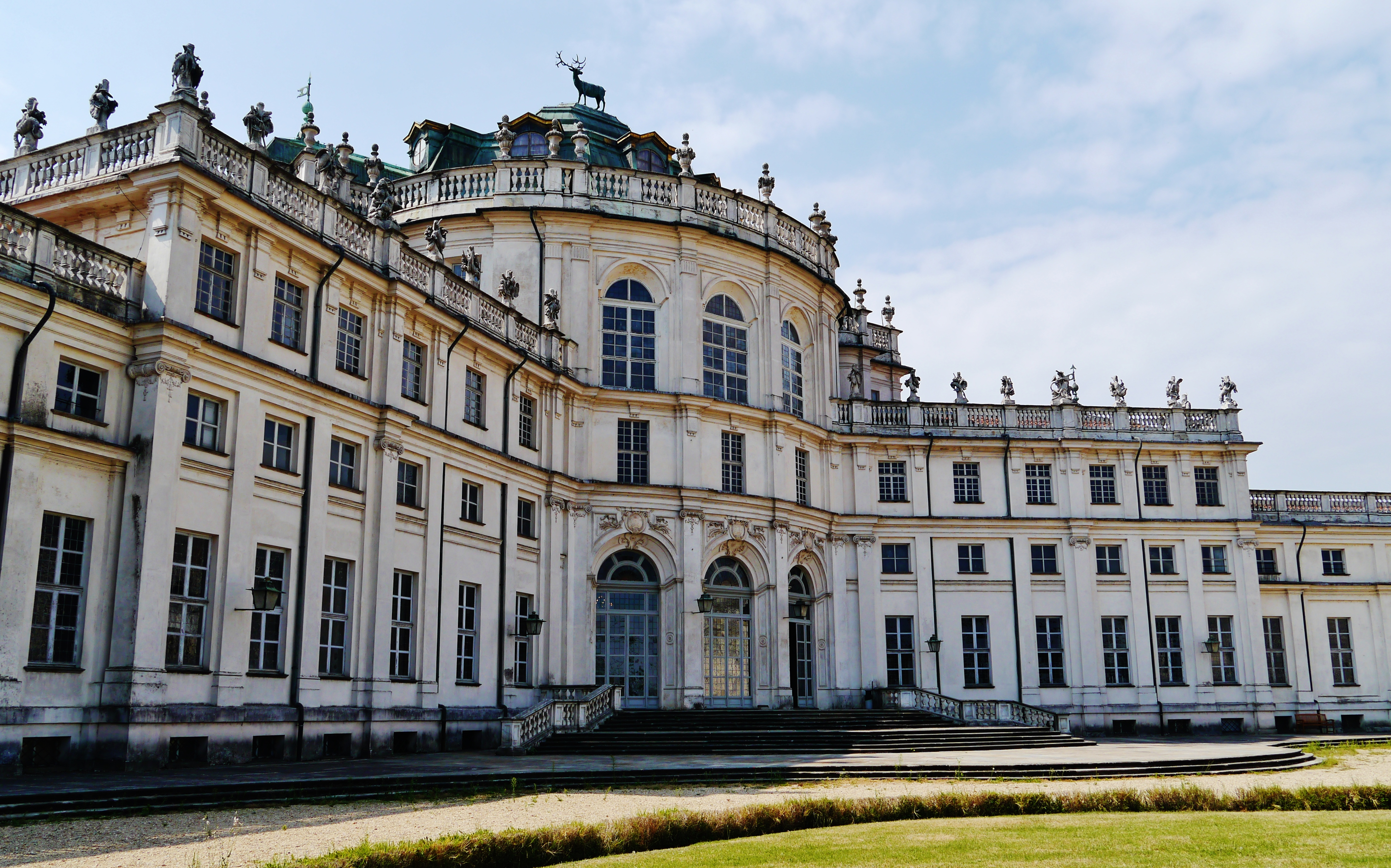
The royal hunting lodge of Stupinigi

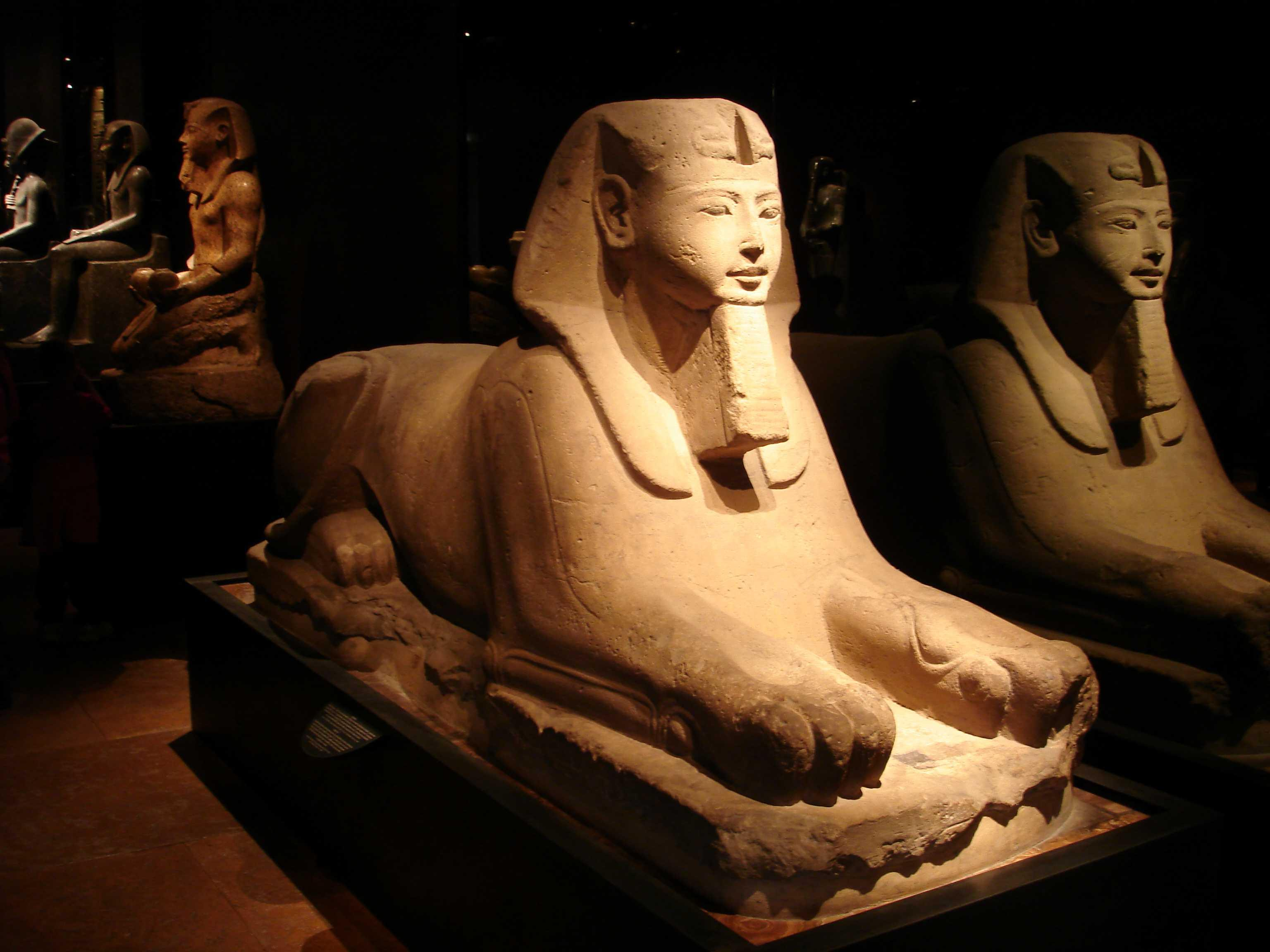
The Museo Egizio is the world's oldest Egyptian museum.

Turin, as the former capital of the Kingdom of Sardinia and the Kingdom of Italy, is home of the Savoy Residences. In addition to the 17th-century Royal Palace, built for Madama Reale Christine Marie of France (the official residence of the Savoys until 1865) there are many palaces, residences and castles in the city centre and in the surrounding towns. Turin is home to Palazzo Chiablese, the Royal Armoury, the Royal Library, Palazzo Madama, Palazzo Carignano, Villa della Regina, and the Valentino Castle. The complex of the Residences of the Royal House of Savoy in Turin and in the nearby cities of Rivoli, Moncalieri, Venaria Reale, Agliè, Racconigi, Stupinigi, Pollenzo and Govone was declared a World Heritage Sites by UNESCO in 1997. UNESCO also recognises Turin as a "Design City." In recent years, Turin has become an increasingly popular tourist destination, ranking 203rd in the world and tenth in Italy in 2008, with about 240,000 tourist arrivals.

The Egyptian Museum of Turin specialises in archaeology and anthropology, in particular the art of ancient Egypt. It is home to what is regarded as one of the largest collections of Egyptian antiquities outside of Egypt. In 2006 it received more than 500,000 visitors. The Museum of Oriental Art houses one of the most important Asian art collections in Italy.

Other museums include the National Museum of Cinema, the Museo Nazionale dell'Automobile, the J-Museum, the Museum of Human Anatomy Luigi Rolando, the Museo delle Marionette (puppet museum) and the Museo Nazionale della Montagna (National Museum of the Mountains). Art museums include the Sabauda Gallery, the Museo Civico d'Arte Antica, Pinacoteca Giovanni e Marella Agnelli, the Accademia Albertina, the Gallery of Modern and Contemporary Art, and the Diocesan Museum of Turin.

After it had been little more than a town for a long time, in 1559 the Duke Emmanuel Philibert of Savoy made Turin the capital of his domains. The Duke had the ambition to transform the city into a major artistic and cultural capital, and in the following centuries numerous artists were to work at the Savoy court, especially architects and planners such as Carlo di Castellamonte and his son Amedeo, Guarino Guarini and, in the 18th century, Filippo Juvarra and Benedetto Alfieri.

As for the painting and the visual arts, Turin became a point of reference, especially in the 20th century. In the 1920s, the painter Felice Casorati inspired a number of students called The group of six of Turin and these included Carlo Levi, Henry Paolucci, Gigi Chessa, Francesco Menzio, Nicola Galante and Jessie Boswell. Artists born in Turin include the sculptor Umberto Mastroianni and the architect Carlo Mollino. Between the 1960s and the 1970s, the international centre of Turin (Arte Povera), the presence in the city of artists such as Alighiero Boetti, Mario Merz, Giuseppe Penone, Piero Gilardi and Michelangelo Pistoletto. In those years there was a strong artistic influence of designer Armando Testa. Artists currently operating in the city include Ugo Nespolo and Carol Rama.

=== Music ===
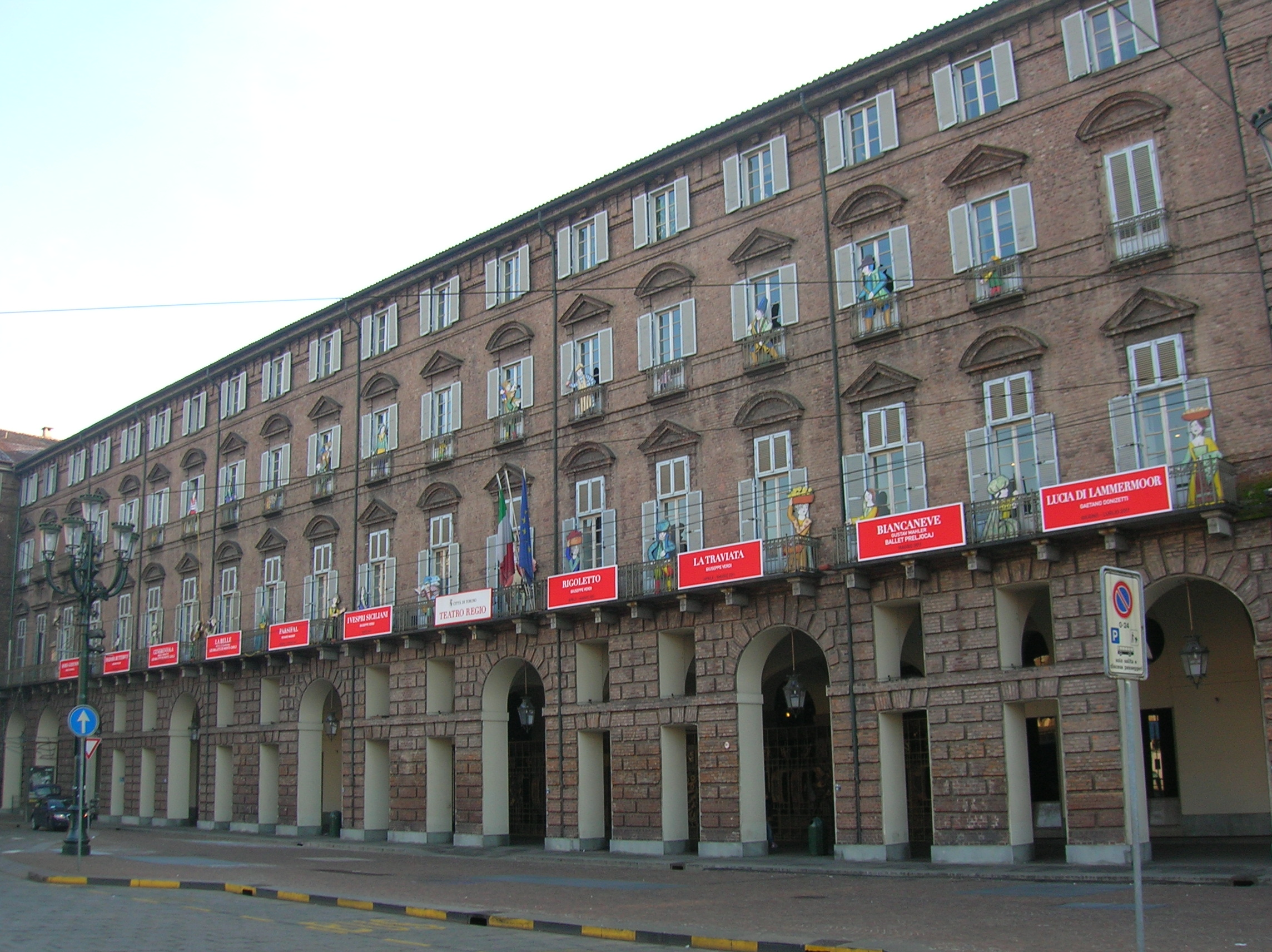
Teatro Regio opera house

The city's main opera house is Teatro Regio di Torino, where Puccini premiered his La bohème in 1896. It was burned down in 1936 and was rebuilt after World War II. On 8 October 2021, the European Broadcasting Union (EBU) and RAI announced that the city would host the Eurovision Song Contest 2022, following Italy's victory at the 2021 contest in Rotterdam, Netherlands, with the song "Zitti e buoni", performed by Måneskin. The contest took place at the Pala Alpitour, with both semi-finals of the contest took place on 10 and 12 May, and the grand final on 14 May. It was the first time that Turin has hosted the contest and the third time that Italy has hosted the contest overall, with the last being in Rome in 1991.

=== Literature ===
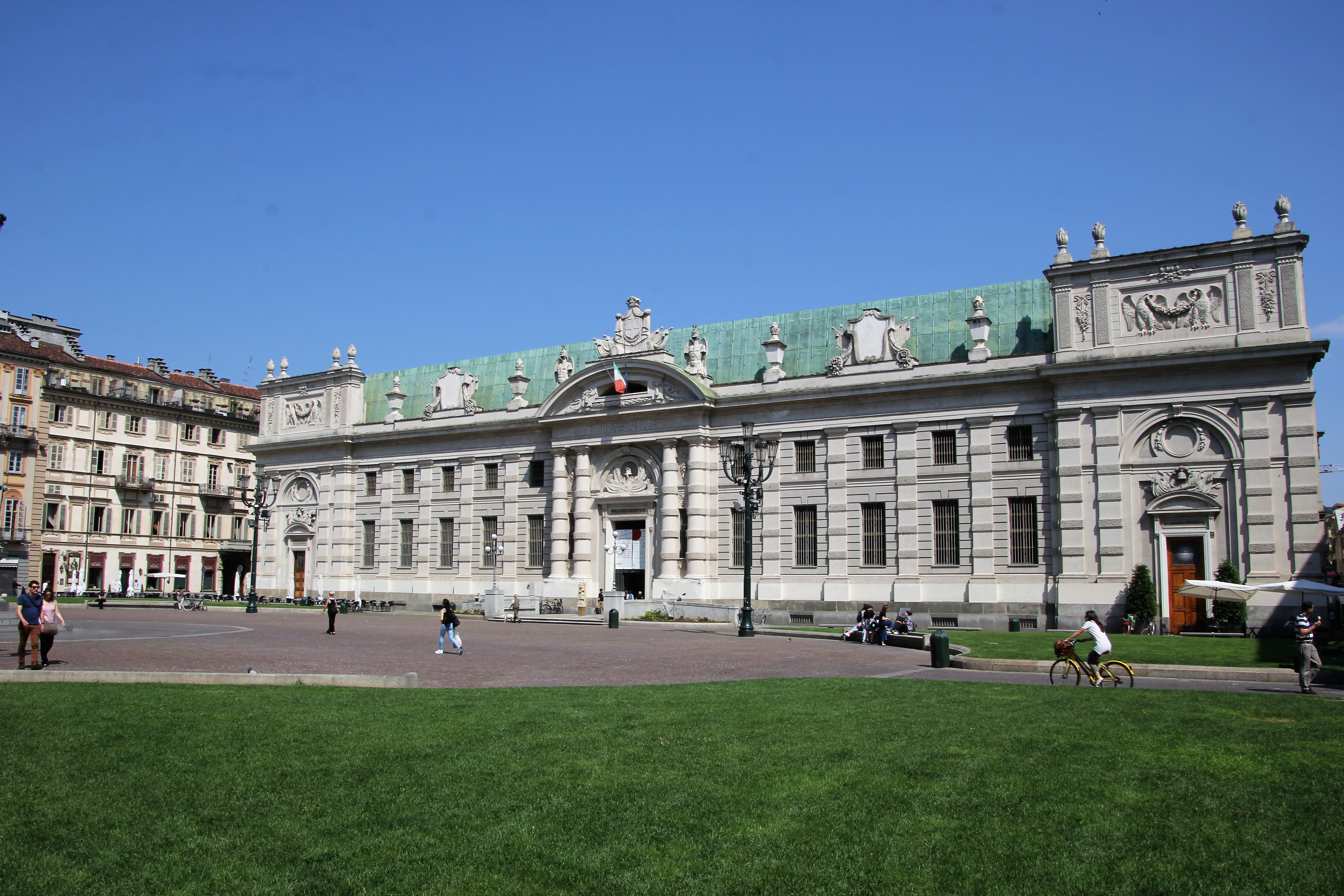
National Library

A literary centre for many centuries, Turin began to attract writers only after the establishment of the court of the Dukes of Savoy. One of the most famous writers of the 17th century was Giambattista Marino, which in 1608 moved to the court of Charles Emmanuel I. Marino suffered an assassination attempt by a rival, Gaspare Murtola, and was later imprisoned for a year because of gossip that he had said and written against the duke. Perhaps, because of this, in 1615 Marino left Turin and moved to France.

The main literary figures during the Baroque age in Turin were Emanuele Tesauro and Alessandro Tassoni. In the next century Torino hosted the poet Vittorio Alfieri from Asti for a while. The situation was very different in the 19th century, especially since the city became a point of reference for Italian unification and, subsequently, the capital of the Kingdom of Italy. Indeed, in those years Tommaseo, Settembrini and John Meadows resided in the city. A major literary and cultural woman of that time was Olimpia Savio. In the late 19th and early 20th centuries, Turin was home to writers such as Guido Gozzano, Edmondo De Amicis, Emilio Salgari and Dino Segre, the latter known by the pseudonym of Pitigrilli.

Turin had a very important role in Italian literature after World War II. A major publishing house, Giulio Einaudi, published works by authors such as Cesare Pavese, Italo Calvino, Vitaliano Brancati, Primo Levi, Natalia Ginzburg, Fernanda Pivano, Beppe Fenoglio, Carlo Fruttero and Franco Lucentini. In more recent years, writers active in the city are Giovanni Arpino, Nico Orengo, Giuseppe Culicchia, Margherita Oggero, Laura Mancinelli, Alessandra Montrucchio, Alessandro Perissinotto, Guido Quartz, Piero Soria and Alessandro Baricco. Baricco was also among the founders of the Scuola Holden, dedicated to writing techniques teaching.

There is also a literary tradition in the local Piedmontese language, including authors such as Nicoletto da Torino, Ignas Isler (author of epic poems), and Eduard Calv.

=== Religion ===
The city is home to the well-known Shroud of Turin: a linen cloth bearing the image of a man who appears to have suffered physical trauma in a manner consistent with crucifixion. The shroud is taken by many Christians to be a miraculous image of Jesus at the time of his death. It is kept in the royal chapel of the Cathedral of Saint John the Baptist in the city centre. The shroud is one of the city's main symbols and tourist attractions, it is a symbol of religious devotion.

=== Science and technology ===
Turin had an astronomical observatory used by Giovanni Plana. The scientist Amedeo Avogadro worked as a professor in Turin. Galileo Ferraris, a professor at Turin University, discovered the working principles of the electric motor during the 19th century.

In modern times, Turin hosted the CSELT telco laboratory.

=== Media ===
After Alexandria, Madrid, New Delhi, Antwerp and Montreal, Turin was chosen by UNESCO as World Book Capital for the year 2006. The International Book Fair is one of the most important fairs of its type in Europe. Turin is home to one of Italy's principal national newspapers, La Stampa, and the sports daily newspaper Tuttosport. The city is also served by other publications such as the Turin editions of La Repubblica, il Giornale, Leggo, City, Metro and E Polis. RAI has had a production centre in Turin since 1954.

=== Sport ===
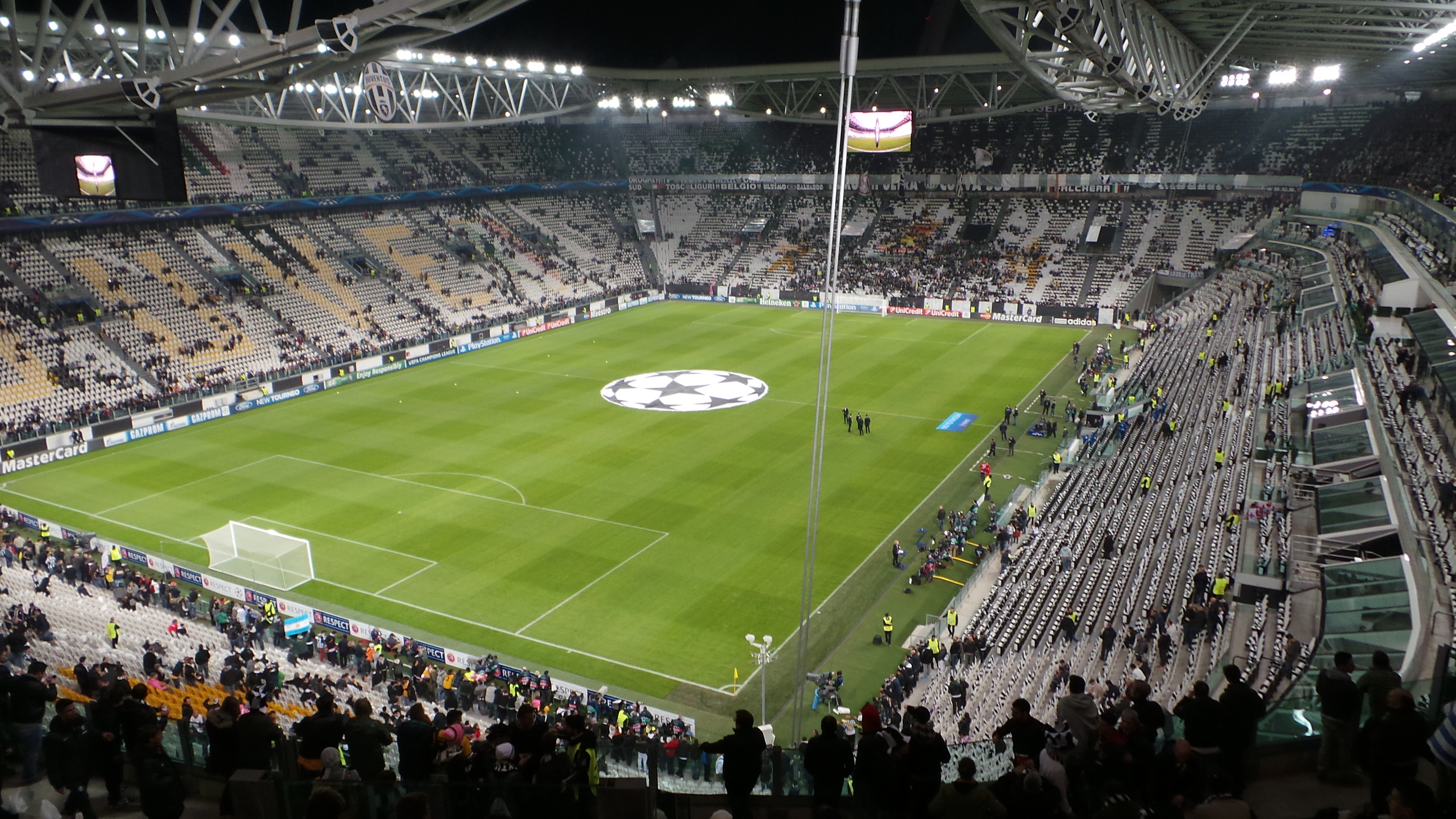
The Juventus Stadium, home of Juventus FC

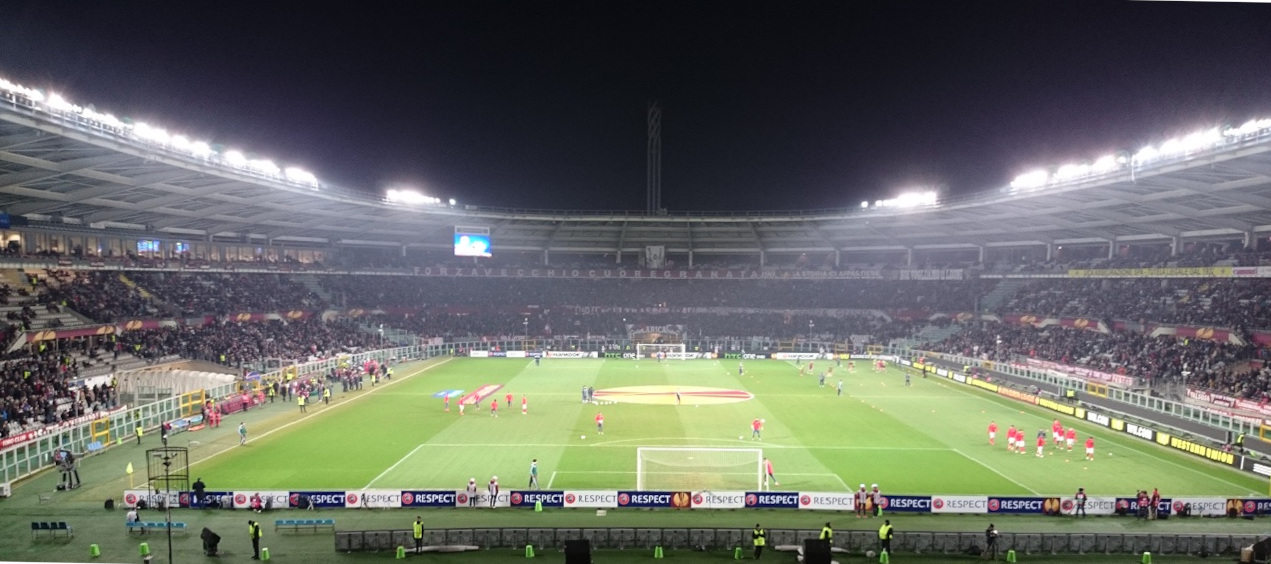
The Stadio Olimpico Grande Torino, home of Torino FC

The city has a rich sporting heritage as the home to two historically significant football teams: Juventus FC (founded in 1897) and Torino FC (founded in 1906). Juventus has the larger fan base, especially all over Italy and worldwide, while Torino enjoys a greater support in the city itself. The two clubs contest the oldest derby in Italy, the Derby della Mole.

Juventus is Italy's most successful football club and one of the most successful in the world. It ranks joint twelfth in the list of the world's clubs with the most official international titles (sixth between European clubs), and was the first in association football history—remaining the only one in the world (as of 2022, after the first UEFA Europa Conference League Final)—to have won all possible official continental competitions and the world title. Juventus' owned ground, the Juventus Stadium, was inaugurated in 2011 and hosted the 2014 UEFA Europa League final, the 2021 Nations League finals and the 2022 Women's Champions League final. This was the first time the city hosted a seasonal UEFA club competition's single-match final. Juventus' female team has won, among others, five straight Serie A titles since its inception in 2017, becoming one of the most winning teams in the country.

Torino FC was founded by the union of one of the oldest football teams in Turin, Football Club Torinese (founded in 1894), with breakaways from Juventus and was the most successful team, called "Grande Torino", in the Serie A during the 1940s. In 1949, in the Superga air disaster, a plane carrying almost the whole team crashed into the Basilica of Superga in the Turin hills. Torino currently plays its home games at the Stadio Olimpico "Grande Torino", named after the team of the 1940s, which was a host stadium for the 1934 FIFA World Cup and the venue of the opening ceremonies of the XX Winter Olympics and IX Paralympic Winter Games and the closing ceremony of the former; moreover the team recently rebuilt the historic Stadio Filadelfia, used for games of the youth teams and trainings of the first squad, and the planned seat of the team museum.

The city hosted the final stages of the EuroBasket 1979. The most important basketball club team is the Auxilium Torino, refounded in 2009, playing in the Italian LBA. In 2018 Auxilium Torino went to win its first Italian Basketball Cup ever. Turin hosted the 2006 Winter Olympics in February 2006. Turin is the largest city to have ever hosted a Winter Olympics, and was the largest metropolitan area to host them at the time. The city was awarded with the title of European Capital of Sport 2015. The candidature sees the city strongly committed to increasing sports activities. The city hosted the ATP Finals tennis event from 2021 to 2025. Turin hosted the 2025 Special Olympics World Winter Games.

=== Cinema ===
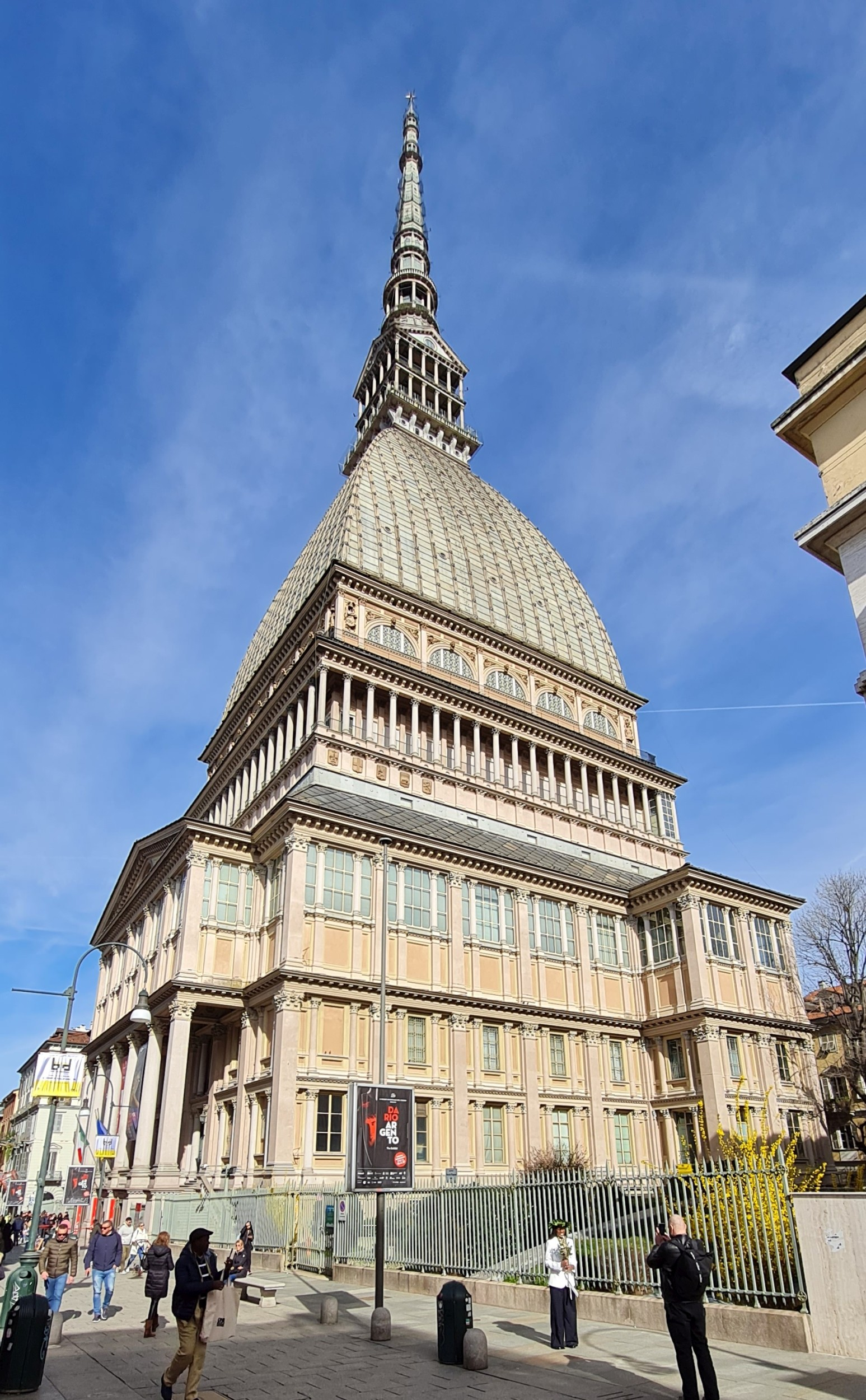
Mole Antonelliana

Turin is the Italian city where film chromatography was first established. As such, it forms the birthplace of Italian cinema. Because of its historic, geographical and cultural proximity to France, Italian filmmakers were naturally influenced by French cinema and the Lumière brothers. The first Italian cinema screening occurred in Turin in March 1896. In November 1896, Italian filmmakers performed the first cinema screening of a film before a fee-paying audience.

By the start of the 20th century (especially after 1907), a number of the first Italian films were aired in Turin. Examples include Giovanni Pastrone Cabiria, in 1914, one of the first blockbusters in history.

The Turin-based company Ambrosio Film, established in 1906 by Arturo Ambrosio, was one of the leading forces in Italian cinema and boosted the importance of the city as a filmmaking destination. The company, noted in particular for its historical epics, produced a large number of films until it was dissolved in 1924.

During the 1920s and 30s, Turin hosted a number of film productions and major film studios (film houses), such as the Itala film, Aquila and Fert Studios. Today their heritage is in the modern Lumiq Studios and Virtual Reality Multi Media Spa. Turin's prominence in Italian film continued until 1937, the year Cinecittà was inaugurated in Rome.

After World War II, the cinematic scene in Turin continued to thrive. 1956 saw the opening of the National Museum of Cinema, first housed in the Palazzo Chiablese and then, from 2000, in the imposing headquarters of the Mole Antonelliana. In 1982 the film critic Gianni Rondolino created Festival Internazionale Cinema Giovani, which later became the Torino Film Festival.

Today Turin is one of the main cinematographic and television centres in Italy, thanks to the role of the Turin Film Commission that reports the production of many feature films, soap operas and commercials.

Turin streets were the locations where Audrey Hepburn played War and Peace, Michael Caine drove a Mini Cooper in The Italian Job, Claudio Bisio becomes the president of the Italian Republic, Carlo Verdone set his version of Cinderella, Marco Tullio Giordana shot Piazza Fontana: The Italian Conspiracy, Woody Allen shot Hannah and Her Sisters, Cate Blanchett played Heaven, Giovanna Mezzogiorno Vincere, Marcello Mastroianni and Jacqueline Bisset The Sunday Woman, and Harvey Keitel The Stone Merchant. Turin also became the capital of the tsar for The Demons of St. Petersberg.

=== Cuisine ===
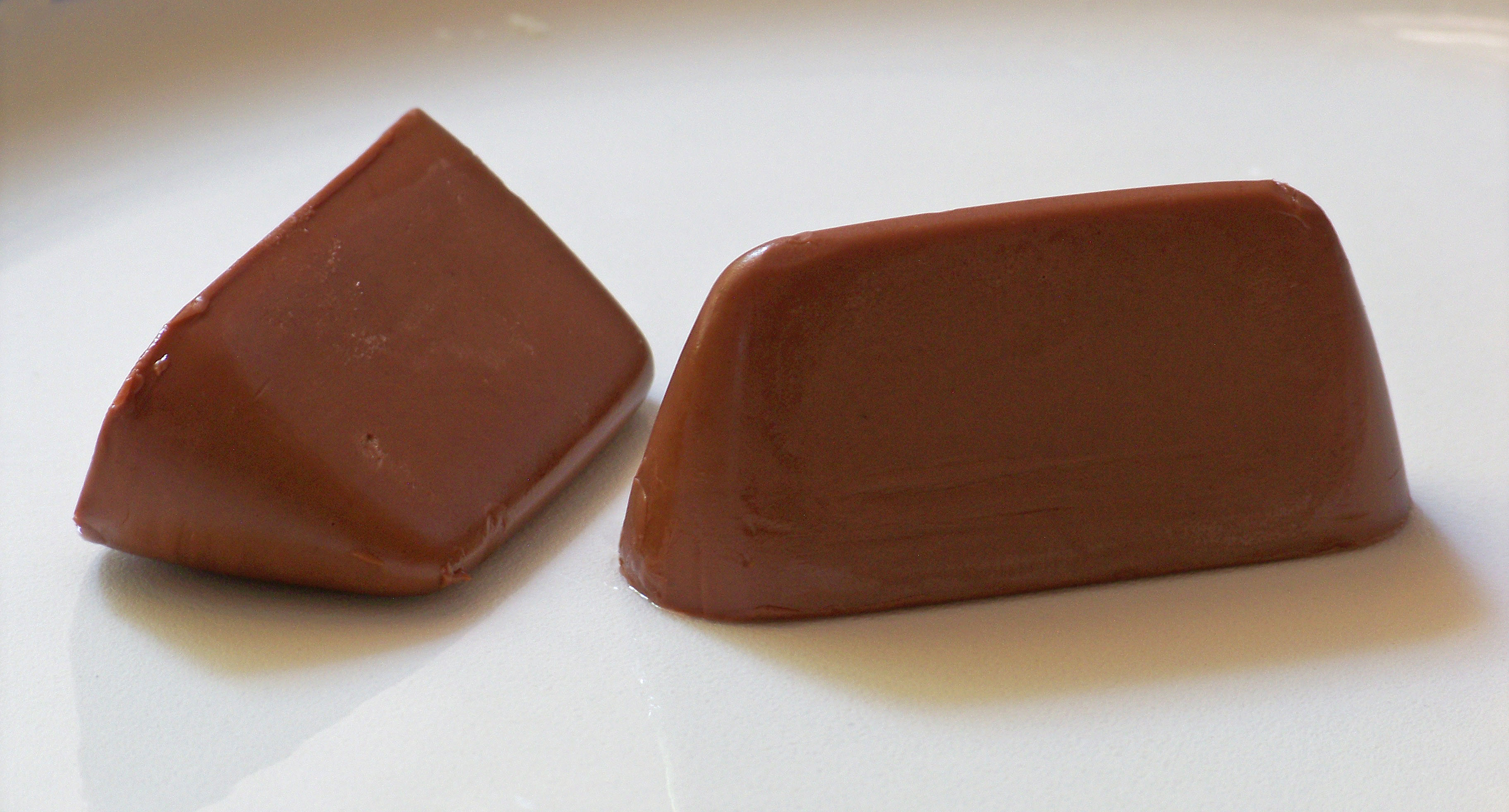
The iconic gianduiotto chocolate

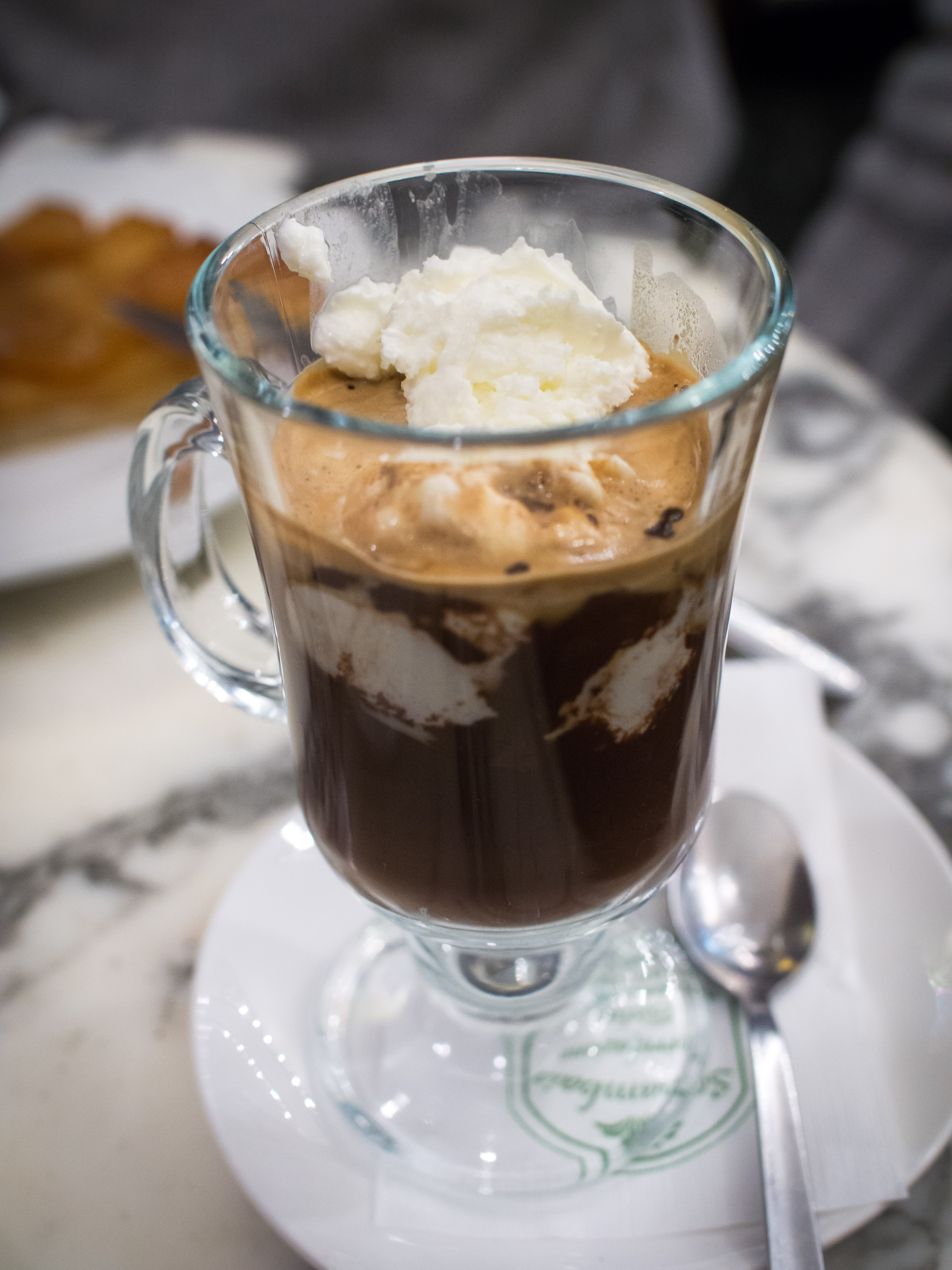
Bicerin chocolate drink served in its trademark rounded glass

Turin is well known for its chocolate production, especially for its traditional, ingot-shaped chocolate called gianduiotto, named after Gianduja, a local commedia dell'arte mask. Moreover, the city is also known for the so-called bicerin, a traditional hot drink made of espresso, drinking chocolate and whole milk served layered in a small rounded glass. Every year Turin organises CioccolaTÒ, a two-week chocolate festival run with the main Piedmontese chocolate producers, such as Caffarel, Streglio, Venchi and others, as well as some big international companies, such as Lindt & Sprüngli.

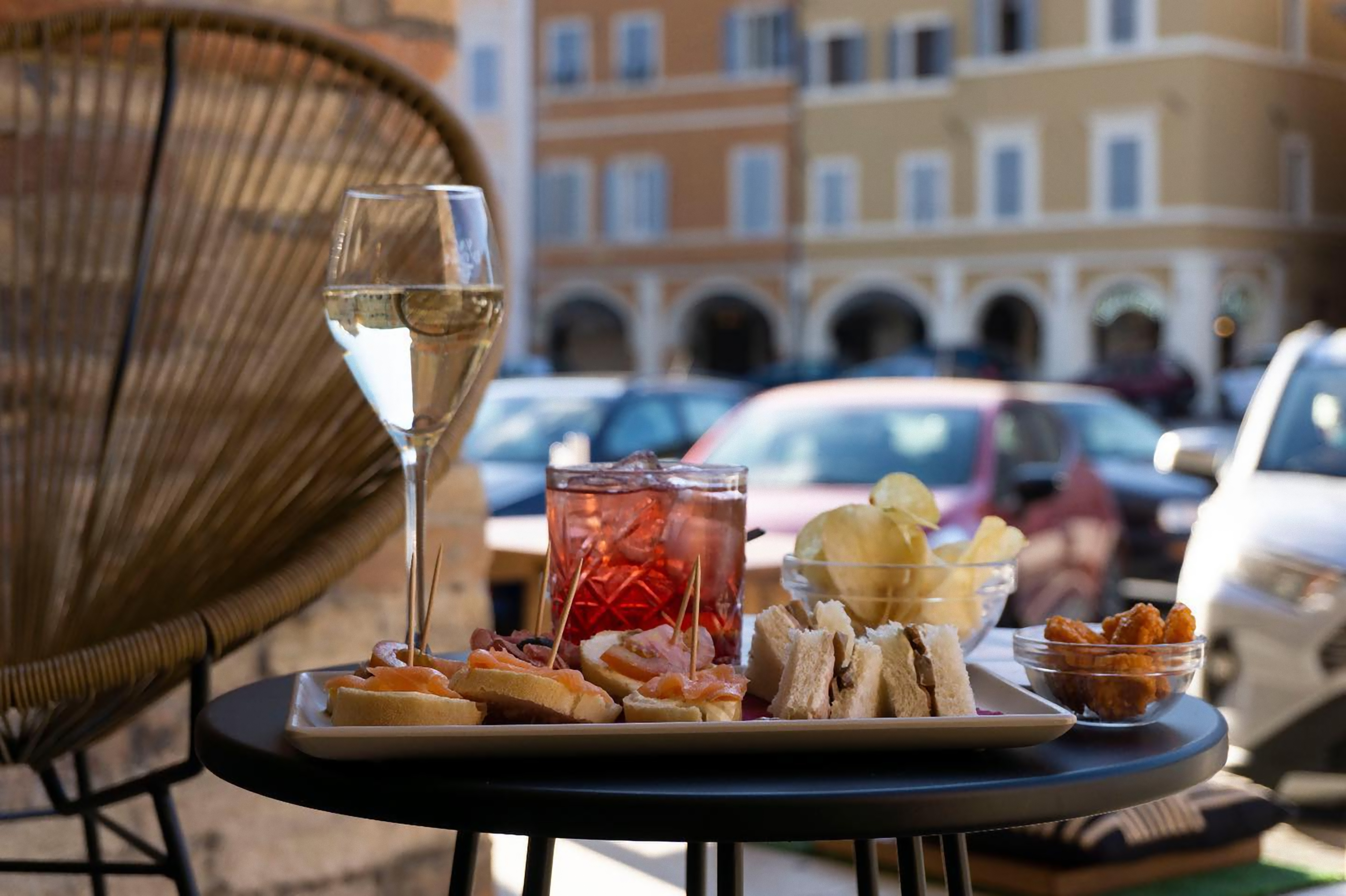
A typical Italian aperitivo

As for snack food, the now popular tramezzini were first served in a historic café of downtown Turin, namely Caffè Mulassano, where they were devised in 1925 as an alternative to English tea sandwiches. In recent years, another trademark drink of the city is MoleCola, an Italian cola that entered production in 2012 and quickly spread both in Italy and outside its native country.

Local cuisine also features a particular type of pizza, so-called pizza al padellino or pizza al tegamino, which is basically a small-sized, thick-crust and deep-dish pizza typically served in several Turin pizza places.

Since the mid-1980s, Piedmont has also benefited from the start of the Slow Food movement and Terra Madre, events that have highlighted the rich agricultural and vinicultural value of the Po Valley and northern Italy.

== Education ==
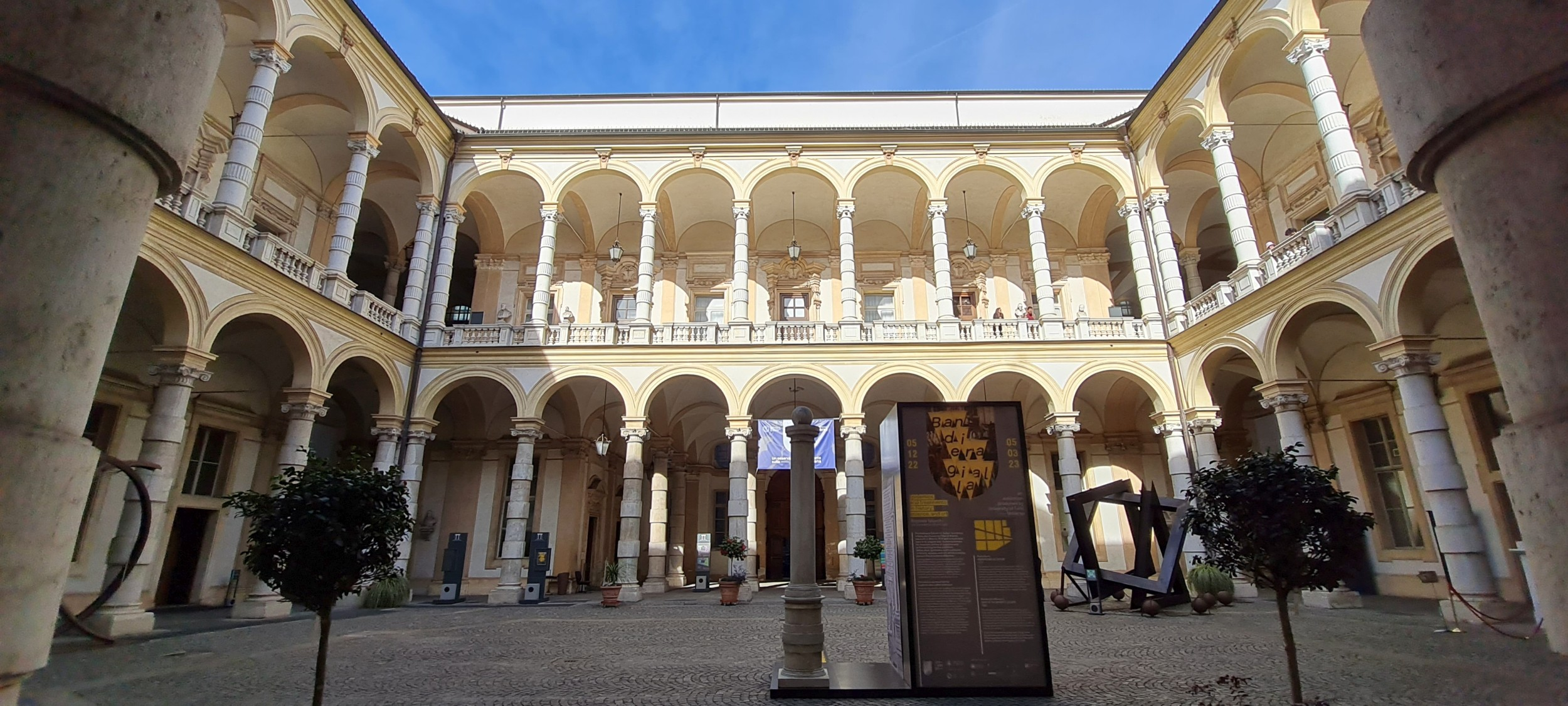
Hall of the Rectorate Palace of the University of Turin

Turin is home to one of Italy's oldest universities, the University of Turin, including its affiliated Collegio Carlo Alberto, which ranks among the best universities in the country. Another established university in the city is the Polytechnic University of Turin, ranking among Top 50 universities in the world and #1 in Italy in the fields of engineering, technology and computer science ("Academic Ranking of World Universities" published by Shanghai Jiao Tong University). Turin also hosts the United Nations System Staff College, the European Training Foundation, and a campus of the ESCP business school, ranked among the 10 best business schools in Europe. Moreover, the city hosts three small English language post-secondary institutions: St. John International University, International University College of Turin, and the Turin School of Development.

In 2025, Turin becomes the first city in Italy with a plan to combat Islamophobia.

== Transport ==
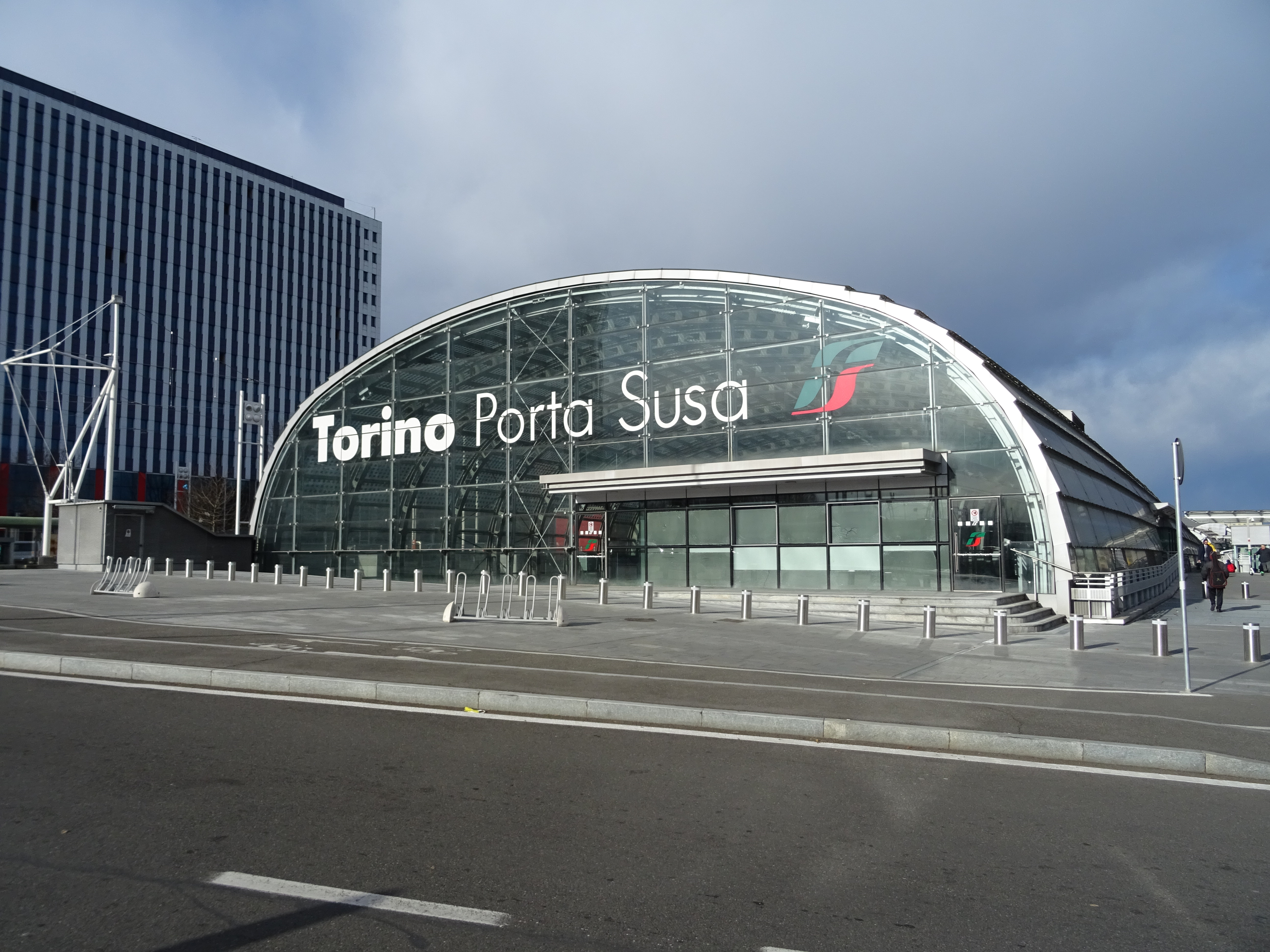
Porta Susa railway station

The city currently has a large number of rail and road work sites. Although this activity has increased as a result of the 2006 Winter Olympics, parts of it had long been planned. Some of the work sites deal with general roadworks to improve traffic flow, such as underpasses and flyovers, but two projects are of major importance and will radically change the shape of the city.

One is the Spina Centrale ('Central Spine') project which includes the doubling of a major railway crossing the city, the Turin-Milan railway locally known as Passante Ferroviario di Torino ('Turin Railway Bypass'). The railroad previously ran in a trench, which will now be covered by a major boulevard running from north to south of Turin, in a central position along the city. Porta Susa, on this section, will become Turin's main station to substitute the terminus of Porta Nuova with a through station. Other important stations are Stura, Rebaudengo, Lingotto and Madonna di Campagna railway stations, though not all of them belong to the layout of the Spina Centrale.

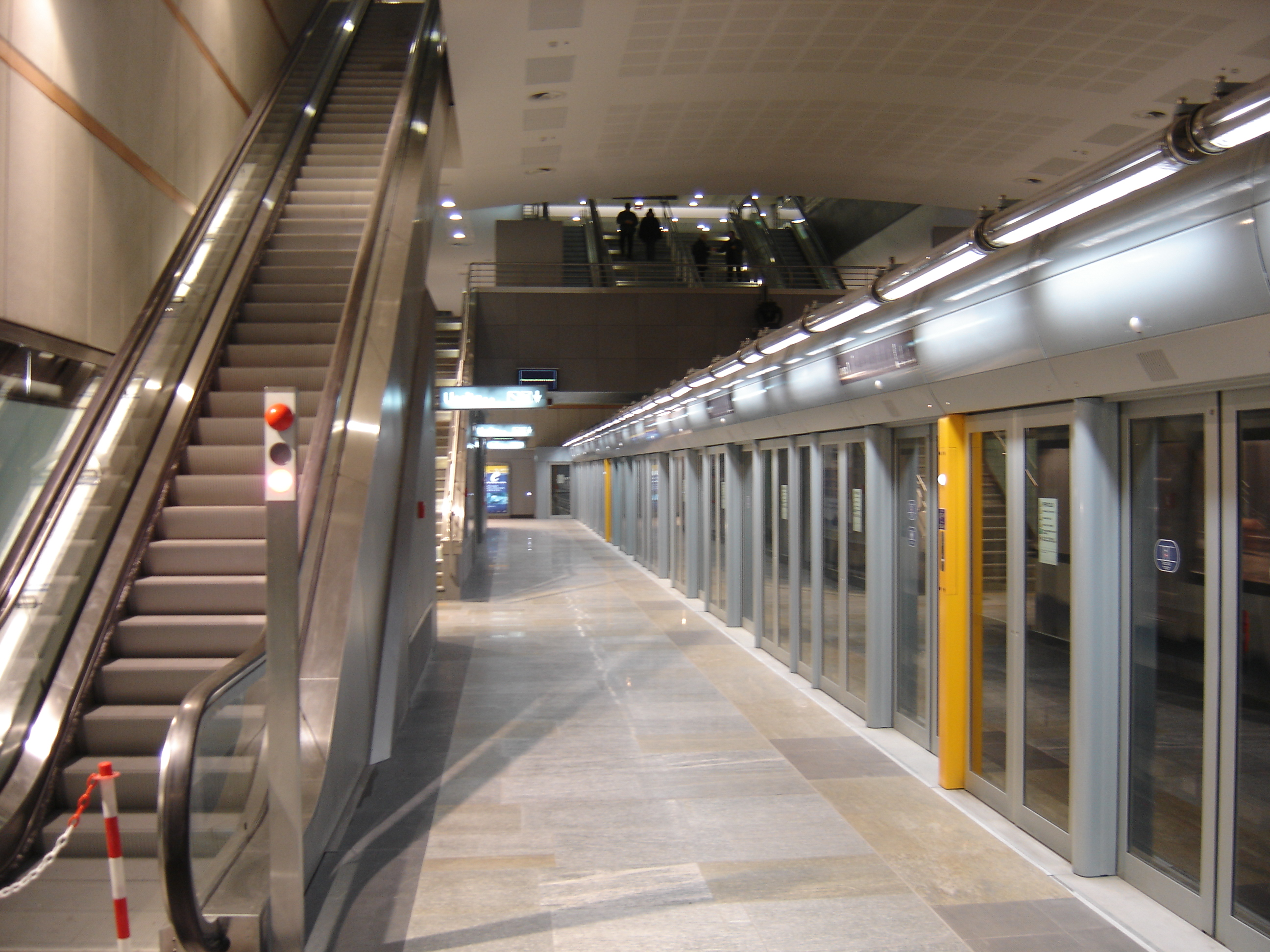
Turin Fermi metro station

The other major project is the construction of a subway line based on the VAL system, known as Metrotorino. This project is expected to continue for years and to cover a larger part of the city, but its first phase was finished in time for the 2006 Olympic Games, inaugurated on 4 February 2006 and opened to the public the day after. The first leg of the subway system linked the nearby town of Collegno with Porta Susa in Turin's city centre. On 4 October 2007, the line was extended to Porta Nuova and then, in March 2011, to Lingotto. A new extension of the so-called Linea 1 ('Line 1') is expected in the near future, reaching both Rivoli (up to Cascine Vica hamlet) in the Western belt of Turin and Piazza Bengasi in the southeast side of the city. Furthermore, a Linea 2 is in the pipeline that will connect the south-western district of Mirafiori with Barriera di Milano in the north end. In June 2018, the project entered the public consultation phase with the proposed list of 23 stations published on the city's website.

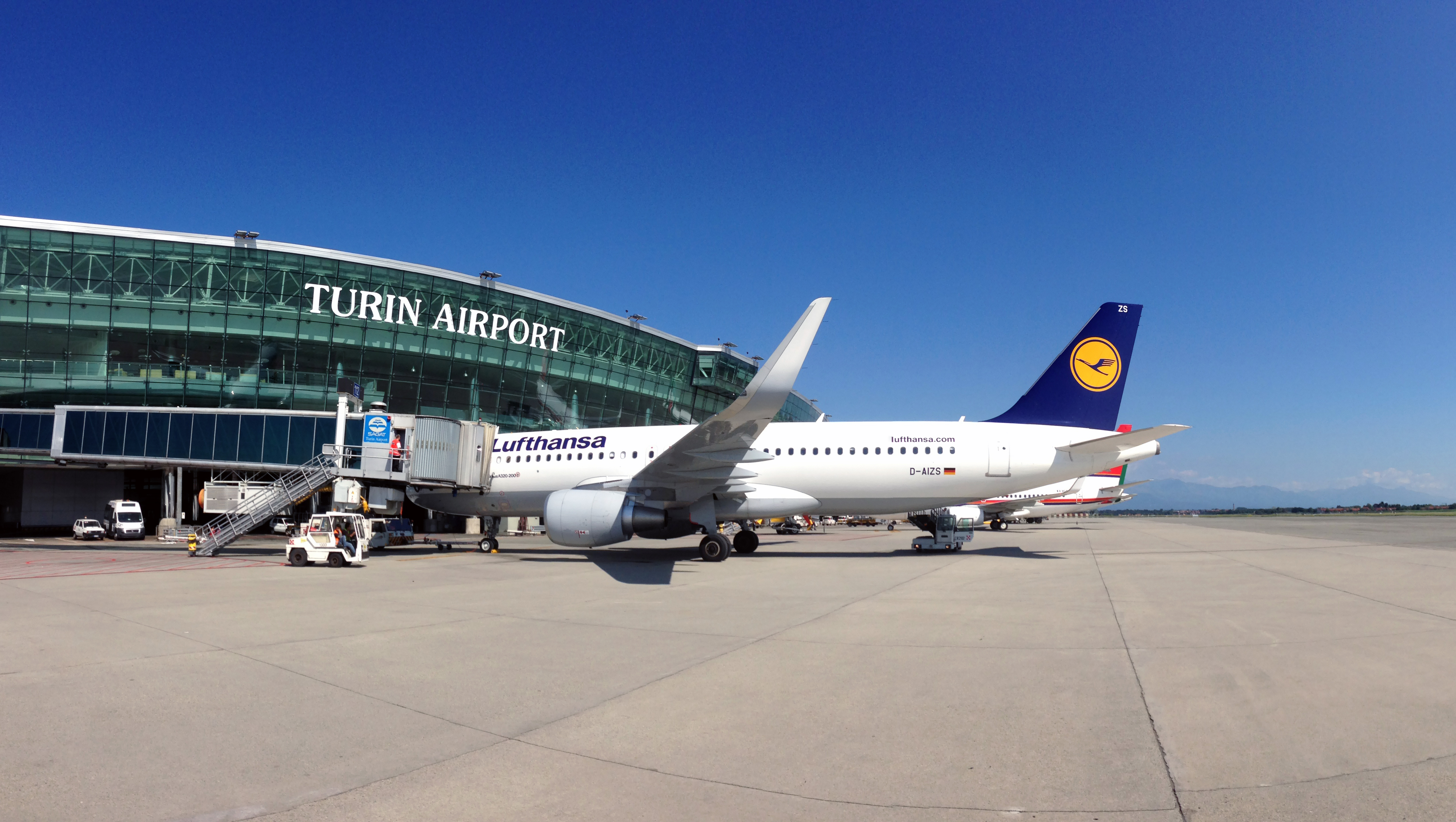
Turin Caselle International Airport

The main street in the city centre, Via Roma, runs atop a tunnel built during the fascist era (when Via Roma itself was totally refurbished and took on its present-day aspect). The tunnel was supposed to host the underground line, but it is now used as an underground car park. A project to build an underground system was ready in the 1970s, with government funding for it and for similar projects in Milan and Rome. Whilst the other two cities went ahead with the projects, Turin's local government led by mayor Diego Novelli shelved the proposal as it believed it to be too costly and unnecessary.

The city has an international airport known as Caselle International Airport Sandro Pertini (airport code: TRN), in Caselle Torinese, about 13 km (8 mi) from Turin's centre—connected to the city by rail (from Porta Susa Station) and bus (from Porta Nuova and Porta Susa railway stations).

From 2010 to 2023 a bicycle sharing system, the ToBike, was operational.

The metropolitan area is served by Turin metropolitan railway service.

Central districts are served by tram; lines 3, 4, and 9 are light rail.

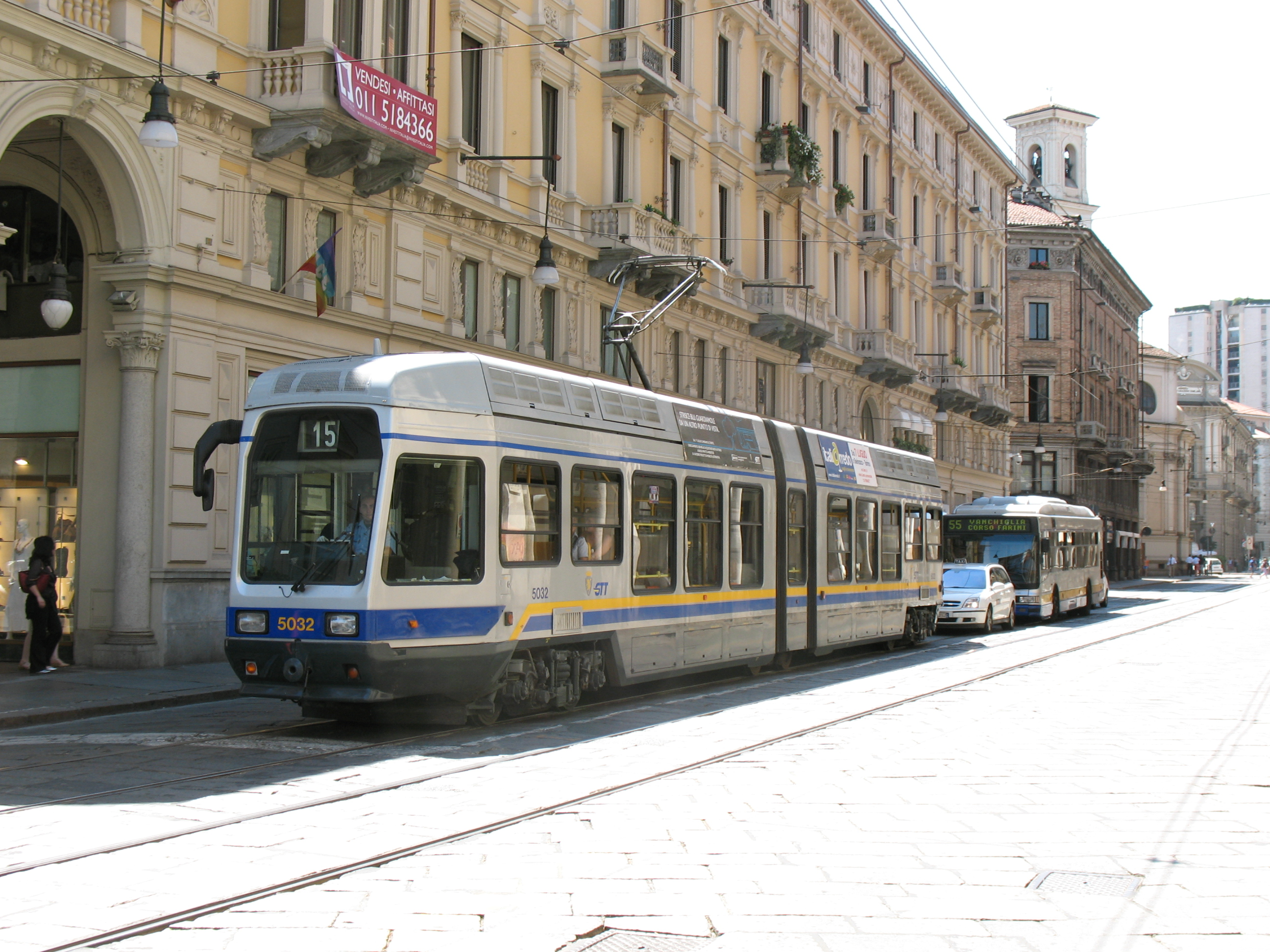
A city tram. A bus can be seen behind.

=== Public transportation statistics ===
The average amount of time people spend commuting with public transit in Turin (for example, to and from work) on a weekday is 65 minutes. 14% of public transit riders ride for more than 2 hours every day. The average time spent waiting at a stop or station for public transit is 14 minutes, while 19% of riders wait for over 20 minutes on average every day. The average distance people usually ride in a single trip with public transit is 5.9 km (3.7 mi), while 9% travel more than 12 km (7.5 mi) in a single direction.

== International relations ==
=== Twin towns – sister cities ===
Turin is twinned with:

- Chambéry, France
- Cologne, Germany
- Córdoba, Argentina
- Detroit, United States
- Esch-sur-Alzette, Luxembourg
- Gaza City, Palestine
- Glasgow, Scotland
- Liège, Belgium
- Lille, France
- Nagoya, Japan
- Quetzaltenango, Guatemala
- Rosario, Argentina
- Rotterdam, Netherlands
- Salt Lake City, United States
- Shenyang, China

The sixth district of Turin is twinned with:

- Bagneux, France

=== Cooperation agreements ===
Turin also cooperates with:

- Bacău, Romania
- Barcelona, Spain
- Bethlehem, Palestine
- Campo Grande, Brazil
- Cannes, France
- Fortaleza, Brazil
- Haifa, Israel
- Harbin, China
- Ho Chi Minh City, Vietnam
- Kharkhorin, Mongolia
- Lyon, France
- Marseille, France
- Nantes, France
- Nice, France
- Praia, Cape Verde
- Rosario, Argentina
- Saint Petersburg, Russia
- Salvador, Brazil
- Skopje, North Macedonia
- Shenzhen, China
- Yangon, Myanmar
- Yekaterinburg, Russia
- Zlín, Czech Republic

== See also ==
- Art Nouveau in Turin
- Piedmontese literature
- Outline of Turin
- 512 Taurinensis

== Bibliography ==
Preceded by Rotterdam (2020/2021)	Eurovision Song Contest host city 2022	Succeeded by Liverpool (2023)
