= Saint Gaudentius =

Saint Gaudentius may refer to:

- Gaudentius of Brescia, bishop of Brescia and theologian
- Gaudentius of Novara, bishop of Novara and saint
- Gaudentius of Rimini, bishop of Rimini and saint
- Radim Gaudentius, beatified bishop of Gniezno

== See also ==
- Gaudentius (disambiguation)
- San Gaudenzo
- San Gaudenzio (disambiguation)
