= Fetta di Polenta =

Building in Vanchiglia, Italy

Casa Scaccabarozzi - Slice of Polenta
- Casa Scaccabarozzi - Fetta di Polenta
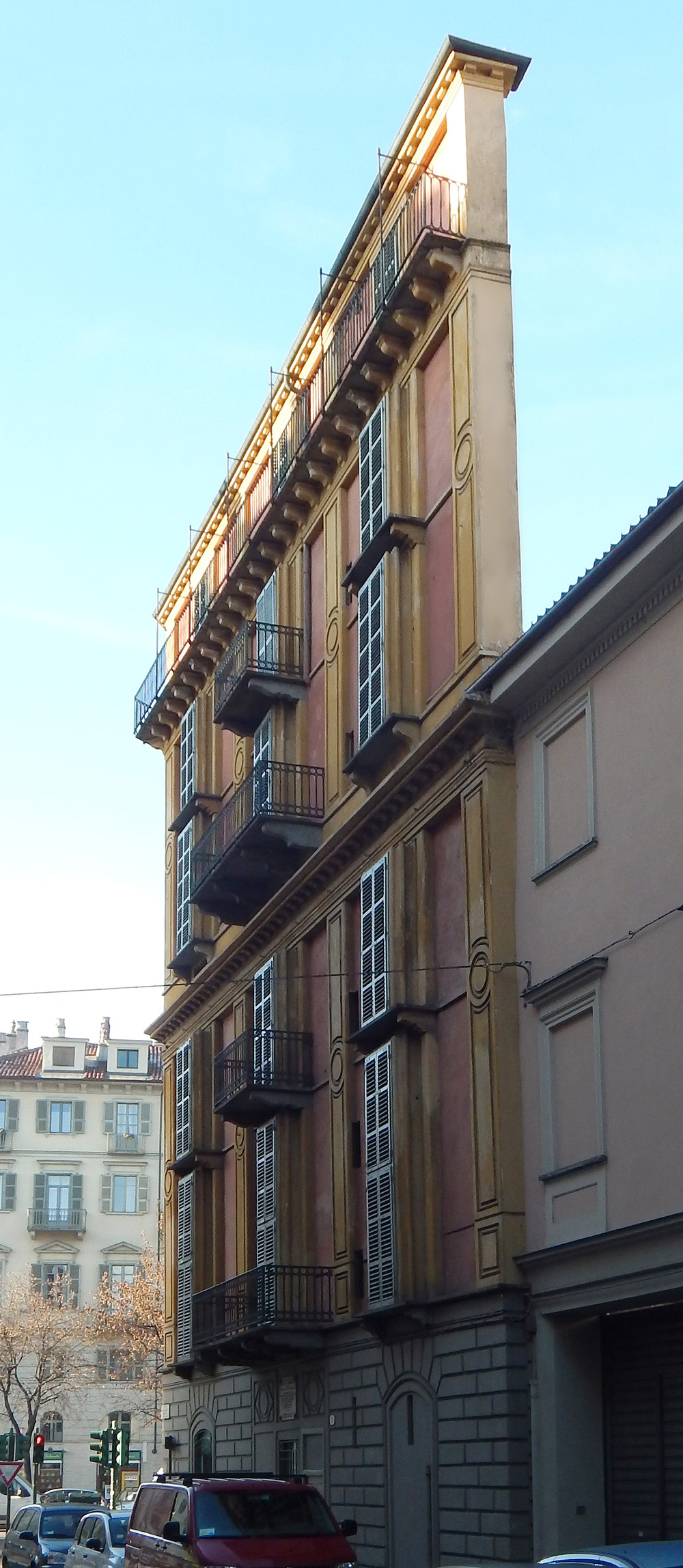
- Interactive map of the Casa Scaccabarozzi - Slice of Polenta area
- Alternative names: Fetta di polenta

General information
- Architectural style: Eclectic
- Location: Turin, Italy
- Coordinates: 45.067826°N 7.696926°E
- Construction started: 1840
- Construction stopped: 1881

Design and construction
- Architect: Alessandro Antonelli
- Known for: Narrowness

Casa Scaccabarozzi, commonly known as Fetta di Polenta (Fëtta 'd Polenta in Piedmontese, meaning "slice of polenta"), is a historic building located in the Vanchiglia neighborhood of the northern Italian city of Turin. It is famous for its unusual and very thin trapezoidal plan and for being only 54 centimetres (1.77 ft) at its narrowest. Its primary nickname due to its resemblance to the shape to a slice of polenta.

It was designed by famous architect Alessandro Antonelli, and its name derives from the surname of the architect's wife, Francesca Scaccabarozzi, a noblewoman from Cremona. The couple lived in the building for only a few years, and then moved to the adjacent building, also designed by Antonelli.

== History ==
The district known today as Vanchiglia was built in the 1840s at the behest of the Marquises of Barolo.The buildings were built by the Constructors Society of Vanchiglia and by the architect Alessandro Antonelli (known today primarily as the designer of the Mole Antonelliana).

As compensation for his work, he was also given the very small lot on the left corner of the current Via Giulia di Barolo. Negotiations to buy the neighboring lot failed, perhaps as a bet or perhaps as a challenge, he decided to construct a building with an apartment on each floor on the very tiny lot despite the limited space available. He wished to recover in height what could not be exploited in width.

The building was built in several phases: in 1840 the first four floors were built and, later, two more were added; the top floor was added in 1881 as a further demonstration of architectural dexterity.

Having won this architectural challenge, Antonelli donated the building to his wife. The building, having now become the symbol of the district soon earned the nickname,"Slice of polenta," by virtue of the unusual trapezoidal plan and the prevailing yellow color. It also became known for hosting the Caffè del Progresso on the ground floor, a historic Turin meeting place for Carbonari and revolutionaries.

To dispel doubts about its stability and to challenge those who claimed that the building would collapse, Antonelli, with his wife, moved there for a few years to live. A further proof of its soundness was its ability to survive unscathed from the explosion of the royal powder magazine in Borgo Dora, which took place on April 24, 1852, and seriously damaged many buildings in the area. Moreover, it also resisted the earthquake of 23 February 1887, which damaged part of the neighborhood; finally, it was spared from the bombings of Turin during World War II which hit the surrounding blocks hard.

In 1974, on the occasion of the centenary of the death of Niccolò Tommaseo, the Municipality of Turin placed a plaque in memory of his stay in the building in 1859. Between 1979 and 1982 the building was the subject of a first major restoration and a particular decoration of its interiors by the architect and set designer Renzo Mongiardino, who worked on all nine floors of the building, transforming it into a single housing unit.

Listed among the buildings protected by the Architectural Heritage of Piedmont, in March 2005 the building was the subject of a judicial auction ordered by the Court of Turin and was definitively awarded in the third round of auction in January 2006. Between the summer of 2007 and the spring of 2008, the building underwent a global internal restructuring and a careful conservative restoration commissioned by the new owner. From March 2008 to May 2013 it changed its intended use, becoming the container for the projects of the Franco Noero gallery, thus returning to the status of a private home in the summer of 2013, while maintaining contemporary art installations that can be visited privately.

== Description ==
The narrowest side of the house measures just 54 centimetres (1.77 ft) wide, with the widest side of the house reaching a width of 4.35 metres (14.3 ft). The length of the building is 16 metres (52 ft) on Via Giulia di Barolo.

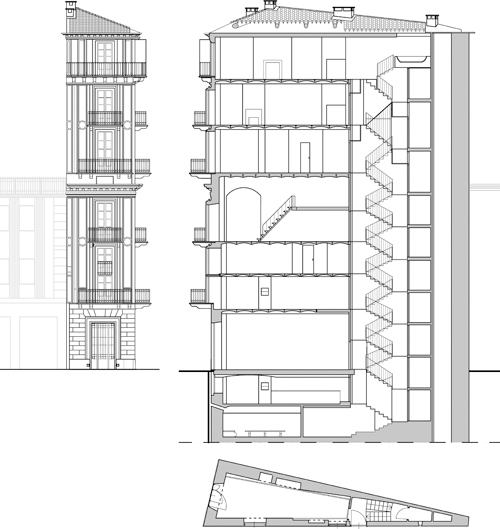
Prospect, crossection, and plan

The building, built entirely of stone and brick, is composed of a total of 9 floors of different heights, all connected by a narrow stone scissor staircase, for a total height of 24 meters. Seven floors are above ground, while two are underground and it is precisely the depth of the foundations that gives the building its stability. On the side of 54 centimeters, to maximize space, Antonelli has made a shaft to place the flue duct, part of the water pipes and, originally, rooms for the toilets on all floors, for each apartment.

Antonelli paid particular attention to detail and equipped the building with large windows and numerous balconies; they are projecting out of the building as are the windows themselves, which appear as a shaped canvas. The use of this expedient is a design solution that Antonelli implemented to gain as much space as possible inside the building. Due to the narrow flights of the staircase, it is impossible to carry bulky loads to the various floors. In this regard, a pulley on the top floor was installed to carry out removals and possible moves, which is still visible from Via Giulia di Barolo.

The main façades are characterized by an eclectic style, with neoclassical decorations and pilasters with geometric reliefs repeated at full height. The showy frame on the fourth floor reveals its previous function as an attic cornice in the first phase of elevation of the building; altogether there are eight balconies.

Until the interior decoration program carried out by the architect Renzo Mongiardino in 1979, the building was divided into an individual real estate unit for each floor. It was precisely by the Mongiardino, a friend of the then owner, that the interiors and furnishings took on a homogeneous appearance. Mongiardino himself admitted that the final sensation was that of "living in a tower formed by the superimposition of many railway carriages".

Between 2007 and 2008 the interiors were radically restructured, enhancing all the original architectural elements of the Antonellian project and maintaining some of the valuable decorative elements created by Mongiardino, including the niche on the top floor, which houses a unique masonry bathroom covered in mosaic placed at the top of the last flight of stairs, the Turkish bath in the second basement, (Note: It is not known whether this was a steamy bath like an Islamic hammam, or a suite of rooms heated, like Victorian Turkish baths, by hot dry air.) the beautiful kitchen, the decoration of the stairs and other accessories.

== Bibliography ==
- Daniela Finocchi, La Fetta di Polenta, Torino Magazine, estate 1989, pp. 42–44.
- Franco Rosso, Alessandro Antonelli 1798-1888, Electa, Milano, 1989, pp. 229–231.
- Renzo Mongiardino, Architettura da Camera, Francesca Simone ed., Officina Libraria, Milano, 2016, pp. 70–79.
- Mitchell Owens, Tall and well stacked, photographs by Derry Moore, "Nest", issue two, fall 1998, pp. 74–85.
- Renzo Mongiardino, Architettura da camera, Fiorenzo Cattaneo ed., RCS Libri, Milano, 1998, p. 62-66.
- Renzo Mongiardino, Roomscapes, edited by Fiorenzo Cattaneo, Rizzoli International Publications, New York, 1998, pp. 62–66.
- AA.VV., Rooms, photographs by Derry Moore, editor Joseph Holtzman, text by Carl Skoggard, Rizzoli International Publications, New York, 2006, pp. 224–237.
- Oscar Humpries, The House of Illusion, "Apollo", November 2010, pp. 56–61.
- Laura Verchère, Renzo Mongiardino. Décors et Fantasmagorie, Assouline, Parigi, 2013, pp. 4, 50, 183.
- Patrick Kinmonth, Of lampshades and lavishness. A tribute to Renzo Mongiardino, "A New", issue one, spring/summer 2013, pp. 76–77.
- Renzo Mongiardino, Roomscapes, edited by Francesca Simone, Officina Libraria, Milano, 2016, pp. 70–79.
- Omaggio a Renzo Mongiardino 1916-1998, a cura di Tommaso Tovaglieri, Officina Libraria, Milano, 2016, pp. 53–54.
- Galleria Franco Noero, A House of Three Corners, testi di Kirsty Bell e Sergio Pace, Torino, 2019
- Silvia Nani, Vivere in una fetta di polenta, Corriere della sera, pp 11, 6 luglio 2019
- Michele Masneri, La Polenta degli Spiriti, Il Foglio, pp 13, 27 luglio 2019
