= San Gaudenzio =

San Gaudenzio may refer to:

- Basilica of San Gaudenzio, church in Novara, Italy
- San Gaudenzio, Ivrea, church in Ivrea, Italy
- San Gaudenzio, Vallefoglia, church in Vallefoglia, Italy

== See also ==
- Gaudenzio (disambiguation)
- San Gaudenzo
- Saint Gaudentius (disambiguation)
