= Bombing of Turin in World War II =

Bombing of Turin
- Part of World War II
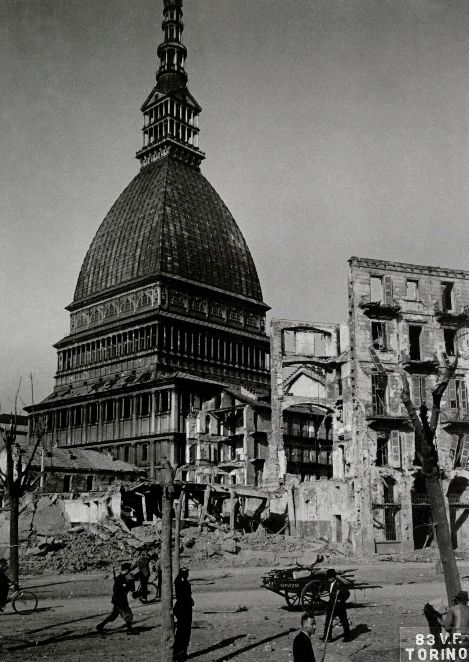
- Bomb-damaged buildings near the Mole Antonelliana
Date	June 1940-April 1945
Location	Turin, Italy

Belligerents
United Kingdom; United States	Italy; Italian Social Republic; Germany

Owing to its importance as an industrial center, home to Fiat and several other industries engaged in war production (including RIV, Lancia and Snia Viscosa), Turin, the regional capital of Piedmont, suffered over a hundred raids by the Allied air forces during World War II; the Piedmontese capital was thus among the most bombed cities in Northern Italy, suffering damage to about 40% of its housing stock, and over 2,000 victims among its population.

== Chronology of main air raids ==
=== 11/12 June 1940 ===
First air raid on Turin. Along with the simultaneous attack on Genoa, this was the first air raid on an Italian city during World War II. Nine British bombers, out of 36 that had taken off from bases in England (two were lost), attacked the Fiat Mirafiori plant. The bombs fell on the city, causing some damage and seventeen victims.

=== 13/14 August 1940 ===
Raid by twelve British bombers, targeting the FIAT Mirafiori plant. The bombs fell on the city, killing 18 inhabitants and wounding 83. One bomber was shot down.

=== 26/27 August 1940 ===
Raid by eleven British bombers, targeting the FIAT plants. The bombs fell on the city, causing damage to the San Luigi Sanatorium.

=== 5/6 September 1940 ===
Aircraft of RAF Bomber Command attacked the Fiat Lingotto plant, hitting both the objective and the city.

=== 19/20 October 1940 ===
Another raid by the Bomber Command; the bombs fell on the city.

=== 8/9 November 1940 ===
Raid by the Bomber Command, targeting FIAT Mirafiori. The bombs fell on the city, killing one civilian and wounding six.

=== 23/24 November 1940 ===
Another raid by the Bomber Command against Fiat Mirafiori; the bombs fell once again on the city.

=== 26/27 November 1940 ===
Raid by the Bomber Command. The city was hit, one civilian was killed.

=== 4/5 December 1940 ===
Another raid by the Bomber Command, which hit the city, causing another victim and eight wounded among the population.

=== 11/12 January 1941 ===
Raid by the Bomber Command; bombs fell on the city, causing three deaths and six wounded among the population.

=== 12/13 January 1941 ===
Raid by the Bomber Command, targeting the FIAT plants; bombs fell on the city, killing a civilian.

=== 10/11 September 1941 ===
Raid by the Bomber Command; 76 bombers took off from bases in England, part of which attacked Turin, whereas another part attacked Genoa (five bombers were shot down). The aircraft that attacked Turin dropped 75 tons of bombs, which fell on the city, causing two deaths.

=== 22/23 October 1942 ===
Some scattered aircraft of the Bomber Command, part of a group tasked with bombing Genoa, dropped bombs on Turin.

=== 23/24 October 1942 ===
Turin was bombed again by dispersed bombers belonging to a group headed towards Genoa; two people were killed, ten were wounded.

=== 18/19 November 1942 ===
The first of a series of seven “area bombing” raids by the RAF Bomber Command in autumn of 1942 took place. 71 British bombers dropped 121 tons of bombs on the Arsenale (Army munitions factory), the FIAT plants and large parts of the city. The FIAT plants were hit, along with the Westinghouse plants and the Nebiolo foundry. 42 civilians were killed and 72 were wounded.

=== 20/21 November 1942 ===
Second “area bombing” raid; 198 British bombers (out of 232 which had taken off from bases in England; three were shot down) dropped 211 tons of bombs, including 120,000 incendiary devices, on the FIAT plants and on the city. Damage was widespread; the FIAT and SNIA plants were hit, as were the AEM power plant AEM, the Martini hospital, the Maffei and Chiarella theatres and the Synagogue. 177 civilians were killed, and 120 were wounded. After this raid, the mass exodus of the population began. This was the heaviest air raid suffered by an Italian city since the beginning of the war.

=== 24/25 November 1942 ===
A minor raid by the RAF, six tons of bombs were dropped.

=== 28/29 November 1942 ===
Third “area bombing” raid; 194 British bombers (out of 228 that took off from England; three were lost) dropped 371 tons of bombs on the FIAT plants and on the city, causing 67 dead and 83 wounded. Among the damaged buildings were the FIAT plants, the Arsenale, the Church of Sacro Cuore di Maria, the San Giovanni and Mauriziano hospitals, the Porta Susa railway station. For the first time in Italy, 8,000-lb blockbuster bombs were used.

=== 29/30 November 1942 ===
Fourth “area bombing” raid; eighteen Bomber Command aircraft (out of thirty-six that had flown from England) dropped 28 tons of bombs on the FIAT plants and on the city, killing sixteen people and wounding fifteen. Bombs hit the FIAT plants, the San Giovanni hospital, the psychiatric hospital.

=== 8/9 December 1942 ===
Fifth “area bombing” raid: 118 British bombers (out of 133 that had taken off from England; one was shot down by anti-aircraft batteries, crashing in the city centre) dropped 265 tons of bombs (123 tons of explosive bombs and 162 tons of incendiary bombs) all over the city, hitting the FIAT plants, the municipal palace, the church of Madonna in Campagna (where 64 people were killed in the collapse of an air raid shelter), the church of Santa Croce, the Vittorio Alfieri theatre, the Polytechnic and the University, the Martini and Molinette hospitals. Smoke columns from the fires rose two and a half kilometres in the sky; 212 people were killed, 111 were wounded.

=== 9/10 December 1942 ===
Sixth “area bombing” raid by 196 Bomber Command bombers (out of 227 that had taken off from bases in England, three of which were shot down), which dropped 393 tons of bombs. 73 people were killed, 99 were wounded; the FIAT plants were hit, as were the University and the ophthalmic hospital. This raid was not very concentrated, and was considered “disappointing” by the British commands, as the smoke from the still-raging fires caused by the previous raid diminished the bombers’ accuracy.

=== 11/12 December 1942 ===
Seventh “area bombing” raid; bad weather prevented most of the eighty-two bombers that had taken off from England from reaching their objective. Half were unable to cross the Alps, many others dropped their bombs over the Aosta Valley; only twenty-eight reached Turin and dropped 55 tons of bombs, which caused little damage and no casualties.

After the autumn 1942 raids, more than 250,000 of Turin's 700,000 inhabitants left the city; nearly 2,000 homes had been hit, along with all major factories, four hospitals, and many churches and historic palaces. The water, gas, electricity and public transport networks had also suffered serious damage.

=== 3/4 February 1943 ===
Another “area bombing” raid; 156 Bomber Command aircraft (out of 188 that had taken off from England; three were shot down) dropped 354 tons of bombs on the city, causing 29 deaths and 53 wounded. The FIAT and Lancia plants were hit, as were the University and the city centre.

=== 13/14 April 1943 ===
Minor raid by the RAF, three tons of bombs were dropped.

=== 12/13 July 1943 ===
Another “area bombing” raid by the Bomber Command: 264 RAF bombers, out of 295 that had taken off from England (thirteen were lost), dropped 763 tons of bombs on Turin (478 tons of explosive bombs, including eight 8,000-lb and 203 4000-lb blockbuster bombs, and 285 tons of incendiary bombs). The entire city suffered heavy damage: among others, the Centro, Vanchiglia and Regio Parco districts were hit, as were the FIAT plants, the Gradenigo, San Giovanni and Mauriziano hospitals, the University, Palazzo Chiablese, and the Monumental Cemetery. The Mole Antonelliana was also hit by a bomb, which started a small fire that was however put out before it could cause serious damage. Firefighters carried out over 1,100 interventions, but the destruction of the water network left hydrants without water; in order to fight the fires, water had to be drawn from public and private-owned tanks, swimming pools and even from the sewers. The supply of both water and gas was interrupted for weeks, and the tramway network was completely knocked out. The dead among the civilian population numbered 792, the wounded 914 (several of whom died of their wounds, bringing the final death toll to 816); this was therefore both the heaviest (in terms both of number of bombers employed and bomb tonnage) and bloodiest air raid suffered by an Italian city since the beginning of the war (both “records” would be exceeded, a mere six days later, by the first raid on Rome.

=== 7/8 August 1943 ===
Another “area bombing” raid, by 74 Bomber Command aircraft. 191 tons of bombs were dropped, causing 20 deaths and 79 wounded. The Fiat plants, the railway workshops and the Porta Susa and Porta Nuova railway stations were hit, as were the Santa Barbara and Santi Martiri churches and the Balbo Theatre.

=== 12/13 August 1943 ===
Another “area bombing” raid by the RAF: 142 bombers (out of 152 that had taken off from England; two were shot down) dropped 240 tons of bombs over the entire city, hitting among others the FIAT plants, Palazzo Carignano and the Molinette hospital. Civilian casualties were relatively light (18 dead and 63 wounded), like in the previous raid and in the following one, compared to the extent of damage caused; the reason was that by now, over two-thirds of the entire population of Turin – about 465,000 people – had left the city.

=== 16/17 August 1943 ===
Last “area bombing” raid on Turin. 133 Bomber Command aircraft, out of 154 that had taken off from England (four were shot down), dropped 208 tons of bombs on Turin, hitting the FIAT and Microtecnica plants, the Molinette hospital, the Mussolini stadium, and the Crocetta and San Paolo districts. The Mole Antonelliana was hit again, but did not suffer serious damage. In the near-deserted city, this raid only caused five dead and 56 wounded.

=== 8 November 1943 ===
First raid by the United States Army Air Force on Turin, now under German occupation. The Armistice of Cassibile ended the period of “area bombing” aimed at weakening the morale of the population; the subsequent raids on Turin were “precision” raids aimed at disabling factories engaged in wartime productions (in this case, the RIV workshops) and marshalling yards. However, low accuracy of bombing techniques resulted in many of the 168 tons of bombs dropped by the 81 Boeing B-17 Flying Fortress bombers (out of 99 that had taken off from bases in southern Italy) falling on the city, causing 202 dead and 346 among the civilian population, which had gradually returned to the city after the end of the raids in August.

=== 24 November 1943 ===
Raid by the RAF, targeting the RIV workshops. Of the 76 bombers that participated in this raid, seventeen were lost and only six managed to reach Turin, none of which succeeded in hitting the designated target; the bombs fell on the city, but without causing any casualties.

=== 1 December 1943 ===
Raid by 118 B-17 bombers of the 15th Air Force, which dropped 316 tons of bombs on the RIV workshops, the marshalling yard and the FIAT plants. The targets were hit, but many bombs also fell on the city, killing 101 inhabitants and wounding 74.

=== 3 January 1944 ===
Raid by sixty B-17s of the 15th U.S. Air Force, which dropped 156 tons of bombs on the RIV mechanical factory, the FIAT plants and the marshalling yard. Sixteen civilians were killed, 42 were wounded.

=== 29 March 1944 ===
Raid by 100 bombers of the 15th Air Force, targeting FIAT Lingotto and the marshalling yard; bombs also fell on the city, killing ten inhabitants and wounding sixteen.

=== 25 April 1944 ===
Raid by 150 Consolidated B-24 Liberator bombers of the 15th Air Force, targeting the FIAT Aeronautica (aircraft factory), FIAT Ferriere (steel works) and FIAT Fonderie (foundry) plants; bombs also fell on the city, killing 37 civilians and wounding 42.

=== 4 June 1944 ===
Raid by 100 B-17 and B-24 bombers of the 15th Air Force, targeting FIAT Lingotto and the marshalling yard. Much of the city also suffered damage (especially the Lingotto, Crocetta and San Paolo districts), with 54 dead and 95 wounded.

=== 22 June 1944 ===
Raid by 100 B-17s and B-24s of the 15th Air Force, targeting FIAT Mirafiori. Two dead and two wounded.

=== 24 July 1944 ===
Raid on the FIAT plants by the 15th Air Force, with sixty B-17 and B-24 bombers; many bombs fell on the city, killing 122 civilians and wounding 118.

=== 24 August 1944 ===
Raid by five B-17s, two civilians were killed and seven were wounded.

=== 28 August 1944 ===
Raid by five B-17s, with one dead and seven wounded among the population.

=== 27 December 1944 ===
A raid by three B-17s caused two deaths and one wounded.

=== 4 January 1945 ===
Raid by five B-17s, no casualties.

=== 5 April 1945 ===
Last air raid on Turin, by thirty B-24s and B-17s of the 15th Air Force, targeting the marshalling yard. Bombs also fell on the city, causing 70 dead and 128 wounded among the population.

== Consequences ==
Five years of air raid caused heavy damage to the urban fabric of Turin, with no district escaping damage; 15,925 buildings were completely destroyed, another 66,169 were badly damaged and rendered uninhabitable. Out of 217,562 homes that existed in 1940, 82,077 suffered damage (38%); more precisely, 7,32 % were completely destroyed, and 30,41 % were damaged. In the Lingotto district, where one of the main FIAT plants was located (thus resulting in this being one of the most bombed districts), 70% of all homes were destroyed; in the city centre, in the area between the Vittorio Emanuele II and Regina Margherita avenues and Piazza Statuto, repeatedly hit by the “area bombing” raids of 1942–1943, 58% of all homes were destroyed.

Businesses also suffered heavily: of 29,016 businesses, 10,424 suffered damage (over one third), as did 1,018 industries, of which 223 were completely destroyed, 315 partially destroyed and 480 damaged. All the major factories (FIAT, Lancia, SNIA Viscosa, Michelin, RIV) suffered heavy damage.

Cultural heritage also suffered heavy damage; among the badly damaged buildings were the palaces of Piazza San Carlo (built by Carlo di Castellamonte), several other historic palaces (Palazzo Martini Cigala, Palazzo Valletta, Palazzo Solaro del Borgo, Palazzo Balbo Bertone, Palazzo D’Agliano, Palazzo Chiablese, Palazzo Thaon di Revel, Palazzo del Seminario, Palazzo dell’Università, Palazzo della Prefettura), the Villa della Regina, the Casa Broglia, and many religious buildings (the Santuario della Consolata, the Basilica of Corpus Domini), the churches of Madonna del Carmine, Santa Teresa, San Lorenzo, San Domenico, Santa Croce, Santi Martiri, Santissima Trinità, and Spirito Santo). The Royal Palace of Turin, Palazzo Madama, Palazzo Carignano and the Basilica of Superga were also damaged, albeit not seriously.

Casualties among the civilian population, according to 1946 data from the Municipality of Turin, amounted to 2,069 dead and 2,695 wounded, whereas the Italian Red Cross provides slightly different figures, 2,199 dead and 2,624 wounded.

The mass evacuation of the city and the deterioration of living and working conditions caused by the raids formed the immediate background to the March 1943 strikes in Italy, which began at the Fiat Mirafiori plant on 5 March 1943 and spread across the industrial cities of the north.
