= Gaudenzio (disambiguation) =

Gaudenzio is an Italian given name.

Gaudenzio may also refer to:

- San Gaudenzio di Brescia, bishop of Brescia, Lombardy, Italy and theologian.
- San Gaudenzio di Rimini, first bishop of Rimini, Emilia-Romagna, Italy, honored as a martyr by the Catholic Church.

== See also ==
- San Gaudenzio (disambiguation)
