= Gaudentius =

Gaudentius may refer to

- Gaudentius (music theorist) (2nd century CE?), Greek musical theorist
- Gaudentius (magister equitum), the father of the Roman magister militum Flavius Aëtius
- Gaudentius (son of Aëtius), son of Flavius Aëtius
- St. Gaudentius of Brescia (died 410), bishop of Brescia, defender of John Chrysostom
- St. Gaudentius of Novara (5th century), to whom the Basilica of San Gaudenzio is dedicated.
- St. Gaudentius of Verona (5th century), Bishop of the Roman Catholic Diocese of Verona
- Gaudentius of Celeia, (5th–6th century), Bishop of Celeia (a Roman town at the site of modern Celje, Slovenia)
- Radim Gaudentius (970- 106/1020), a member of Slavnik's dynasty, was the first archbishop of Gniezno from 1000 until 1006/1020
- Gaudentius of Ossero (11th century), bishop of Ossero
- Gaudentius of Rimini (4th century), bishop of Rimini and martyr
