= Synagogue of Turin =

Orthodox synagogue in Turin, Italy

- Italian: Sinagoga di Torino
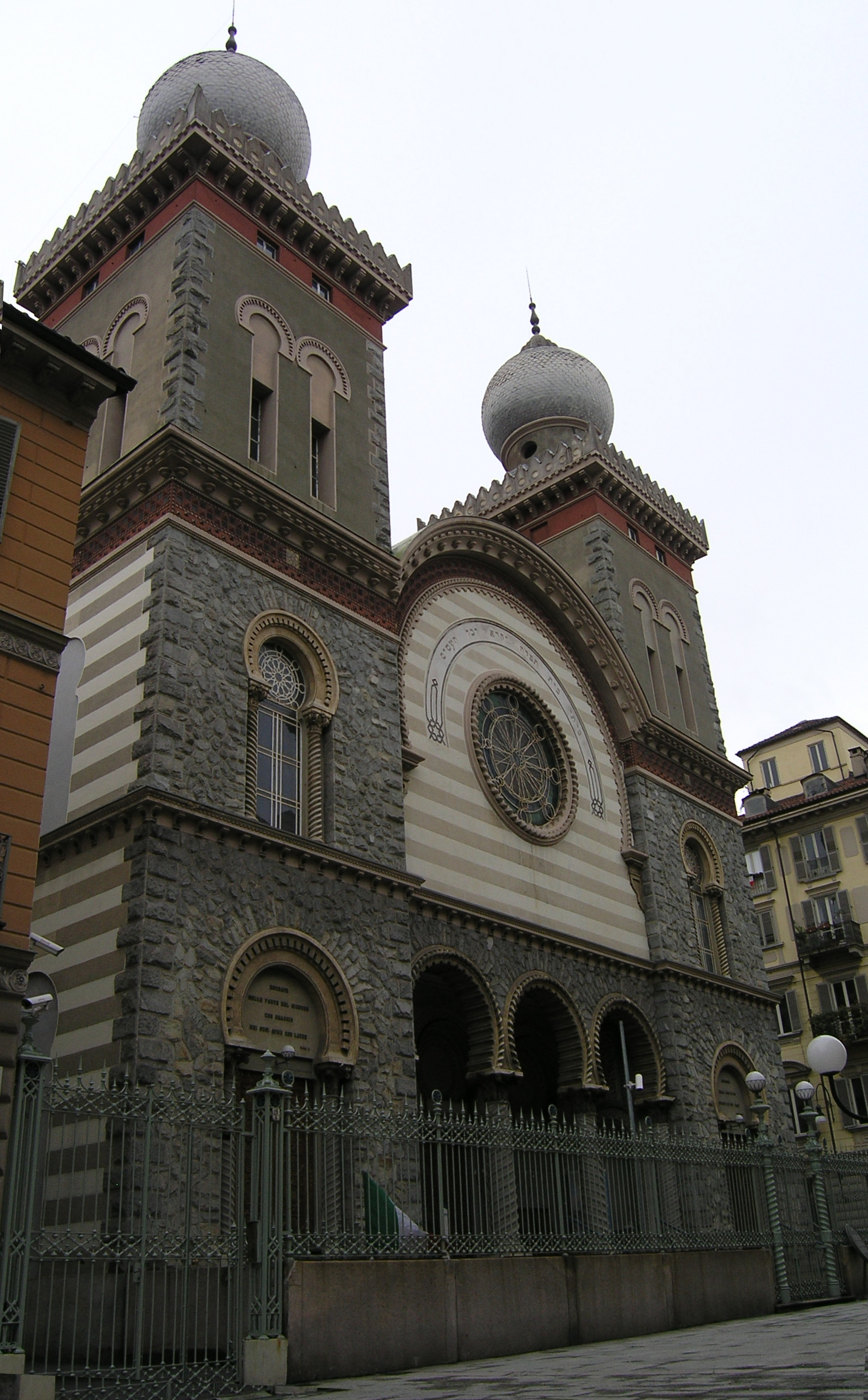
- The synagogue façade, in 2011

- Location of the synagogue in Turin

Religion
- Affiliation: Judaism
- Rite: Italian rite; Spanish rite
- Ecclesiastical or organisational status: Synagogue
- Status: Active

Location
- Location: 12 Via Pio V, Turin, Piedmont
- Country: Italy
- Coordinates: 45°03′37″N 7°40′56″E

Architecture
- Architect: Enrico Petiti
- Type: Synagogue architecture
- Style: Moorish Revival
- Established: 1848 (as a congregation)
- Groundbreaking: 1880
- Completed: 1884

Specifications
- Capacity: 1400 worshipers
- Dome: Three (maybe more)
- Materials: Brick

The Synagogue of Turin (Italian: Sinagoga di Torino), also known as Israelite Temple (Italian: Tempio Israelitico), is a Jewish congregation and synagogue, that is located at 12 Via Pio V, in Turin, Piedmont, Italy. Designed by Enrico Petiti in the Moorish Revival style, the synagogue was completed in 1884.

== History ==
After regaining their civil rights in the Kingdom of Sardinia through the institution of the Albertine Statute in 1848, the Jewish community wished to build a synagogue in Turin, in order to establish their presence in the Kingdom's capital.

In 1859 the community tasked architect Alessandro Antonelli to build what would be their future temple, and works started swiftly. In 1875 it became clear that the architect's vision was beyond the scope, size, and budget of the community. For this reason, they chose to sell the half-completed building to the city in exchange for a sum of money and the land upon which the current-day synagogue stands. The building sold by the community would eventually become known as Mole Antonelliana.

In 1880 architect Enrico Petiti started works for the present-day Moorish Revival-style synagogue, that was completed in 1884.

On November 20, 1942, Allied bombardments on the city completely destroyed the synagogue, with the exception of the exterior walls. It was rebuilt between 1945 and 1949 to its current status.

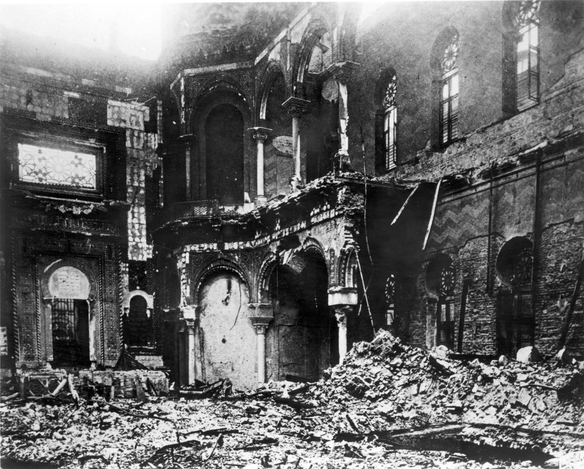
The Synagogue of Turin in 1942, after the bombardment

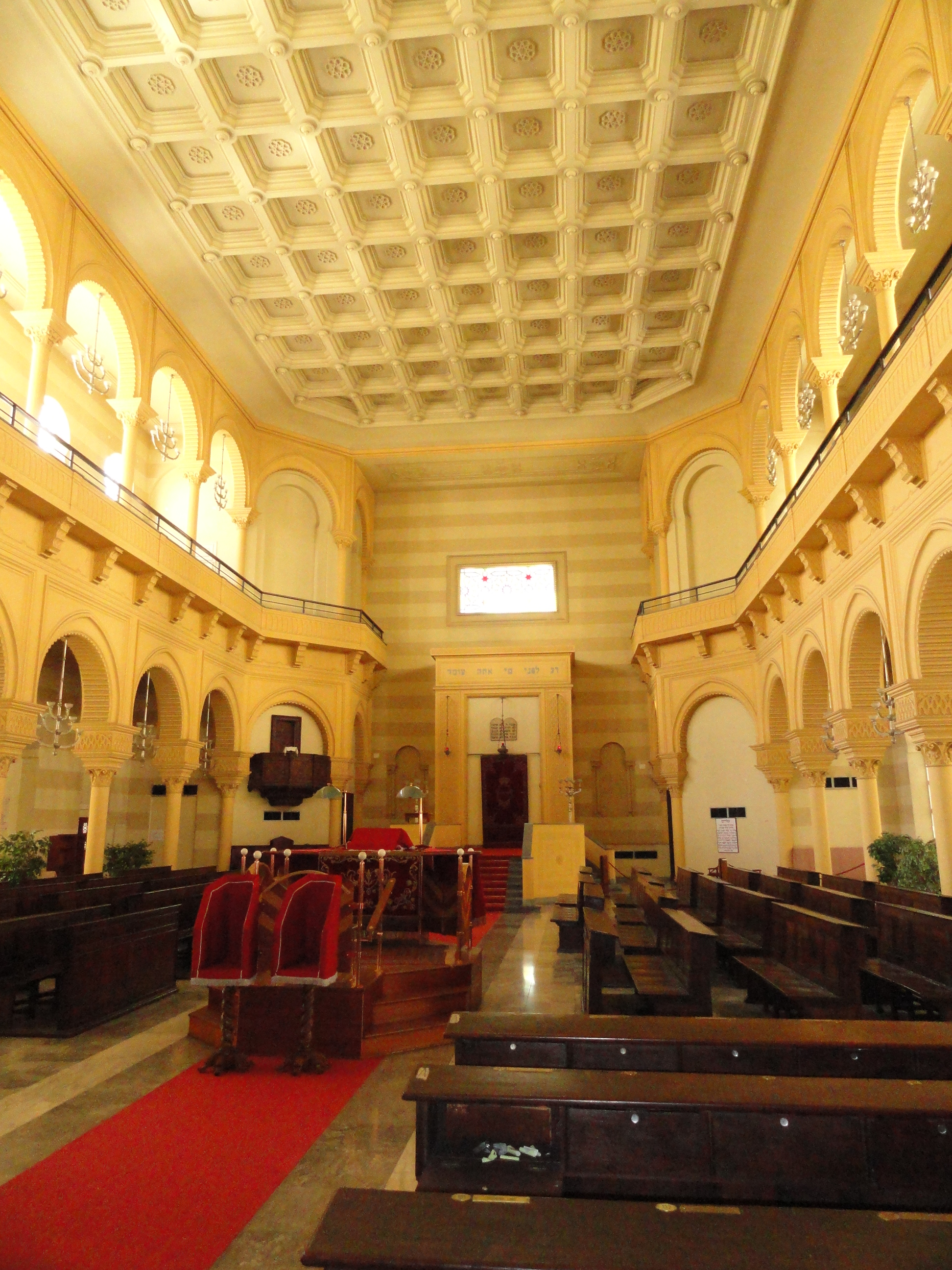
Interior of the Tempio Grande (Great temple)

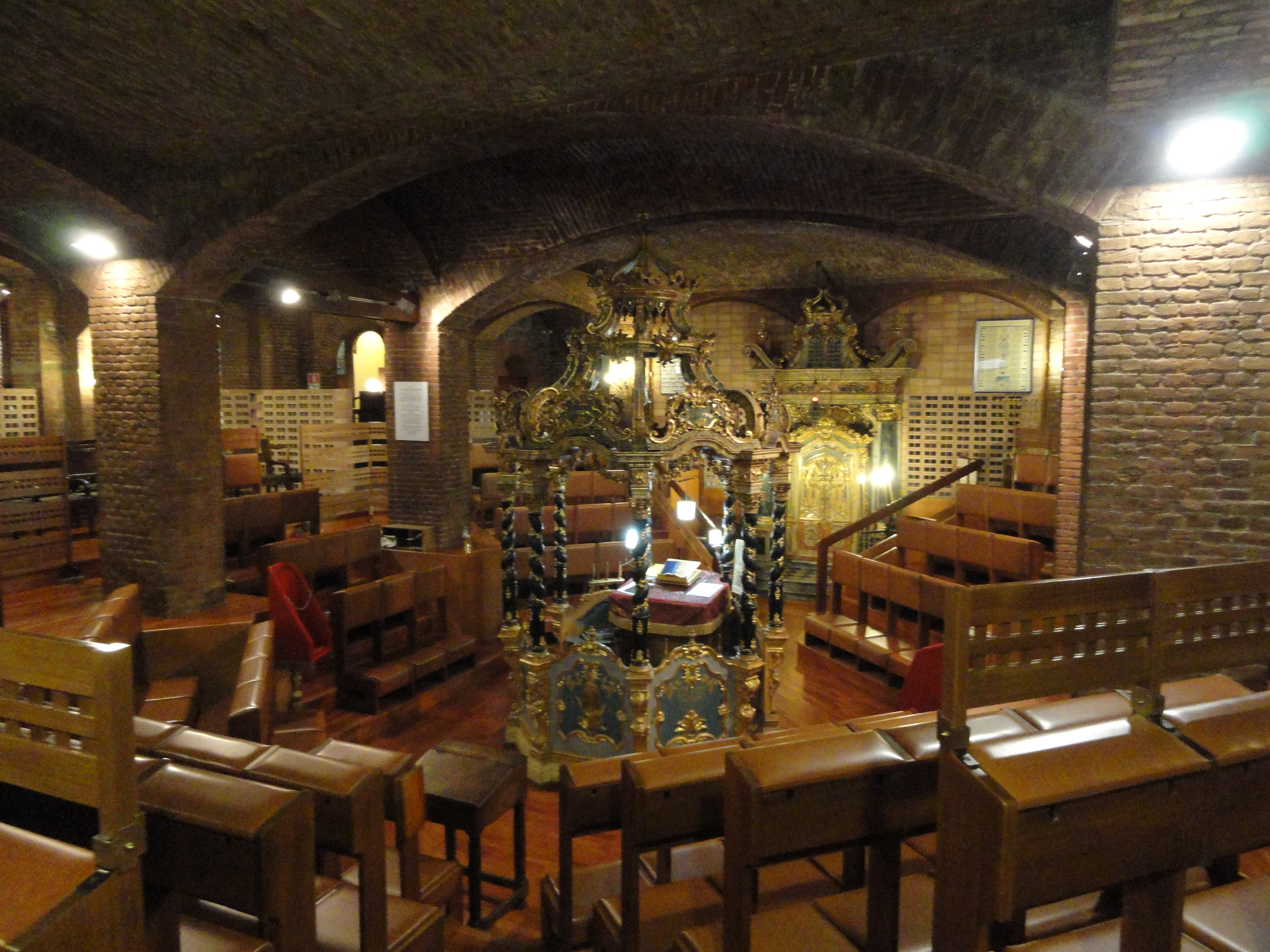
Italki rite synagogue, known as Tempio Piccolo (Small temple), created in 1970 on the basement floor and furnished with Baroque furniture that came from the synagogue of Chieri

== See also ==
- History of the Jews in Italy
- List of synagogues in Italy
