= Italian euro coins =

Euro coins issued by Italy

Italian euro coins have a design unique to each denomination, though there is a common theme of famous Italian works of art throughout history. Each coin is designed by a different designer, from the 1 cent to the 2 euro coin they are: Eugenio Driutti, Luciana De Simoni, Ettore Lorenzo Frapiccini, Claudia Momoni, Maria Angela Cassol, Roberto Mauri, Laura Cretara and Maria Carmela Colaneri. All designs feature the 12 stars of the EU, the year of imprint, the overlapping letters "RI" for Repubblica Italiana (Italian Republic) and the letter R for Rome. There are no Italian euro coins dated earlier than 2002, even though they were certainly minted earlier, as they were first distributed to the public in December 2001.

== History ==
The choice of the design of the coins was left to the Italian public by means of a television broadcast where alternative designs were presented, letting the people vote by calling a certain telephone number. However, the 1 euro coin was missing in this election, because Carlo Azeglio Ciampi, the then economy minister, had already decided it would feature the Vitruvian Man of Leonardo da Vinci. Leonardo's work is highly symbolic as it represents the Renaissance focus on man as the measure of all things, and has simultaneously a round shape that fits the coin perfectly. As Ciampi observed, this represents the "coin to the service of Man", instead of Man to the service of money.

== Italian euro design ==
For images of the common side and a detailed description of the coins, see euro coins.

Depiction of Italian euro coinage | Obverse side
€0.01	€0.02	€0.05
The Castel del Monte, a 13th-century castle in Apulia	Mole Antonelliana, a tower symbolising the city of Turin	Colosseum, amphitheatre in Rome
Castel del Monte, a 13th-century castle in Andria	Mole Antonelliana, a tower symbolising the city of Turin	Colosseum, famous Roman amphitheater
€0.10	€0.20	€0.50
The Birth of Venus by painter Sandro Botticelli	Futurist sculpture Unique Forms of Continuity in Space by Umberto Boccioni	The Equestrian Statue of Marcus Aurelius
The Birth of Venus by Sandro Botticelli	Futurist sculpture Unique Forms of Continuity in Space by Umberto Boccioni	Equestrian Statue of Marcus Aurelius
€1.00	€2.00	€2 Coin Edge
Vitruvian Man	Dante Alighieri	for a total of 12 stars
Vitruvian Man, a drawing by Leonardo da Vinci	Dante Alighieri, an Italian poet, writer and philosopher, considered the father of the Italian language	for a total of 12 stars

== Circulating mintage quantities ==
Face Value	€0.01	€0.02	€0.05	€0.10	€0.20	€0.50	€1.00	€2.00
2002	1,348,599,501	1,098,866,250	1,341,442,204	1,142,083,000	1,411,536,000	1,136,418,000	965,725,300	463,402,200
2003	9,637,000	21,555,000	1,844,000	29,714,000	25,893,000	44,563,000	66,230,000	36,098,000
2004	99,925,000	119,925,000	9,925,000	4,925,000	4,925,000	4,925,000	4,925,000	6,925,000
2005	179,943,900	119,943,900	69,943,900	99,943,900	4,943,900	4,943,900	4,943,900	61,943,900
2006	158,951,700	195,951,700	118,951,700	179,951,700	4,951,700	4,951,700	107,951,700	9,951,700
2007	214,953,000	139,953,000	84,953,000	104,953,000	4,953,000	4,953,000	134,953,000	4,953,000
2008	180,000,000	135,000,000	90,000,000	105,000,000	5,000,000	5,000,000	135,000,000	2,500,000
2009	174,952,000	184,952,000	84,952,000	105,952,000	59,952,000	2,452,000	114,952,000	1,952,000
2010	125,448,100	120,243,400	67,618,100	91,328,400	57,787,000	9,209,800	96,533,100	5,788,100
2011	133,691,709	109,158,400	37,096,565	76,119,500	67,758,340	5,000,000	98,033,010	14,065,890
2012	217,400,000	80,000,000	62,500,000	97,400,000	5,000,000	5,000,000	5,000,000	27,000,000
2013	243,460,000	150,100,000	80,000,000	15,000,000	15,000,000	5,000,000	5,000,000	10,000,000
2014	150,000,000	115,000,000	40,000,000	10,000,000	10,000,000	5,000,000	5,000,000	3,000,000
2015	220,000,000	120,000,000	30,000,000	10,000,000	5,000,000	5,000,000	5,000,000	2,000,000
2016	160,000,000	140,000,000	70,000,000	15,000,000	5,000,000	5,000,000	3,000,000	2,000,000
2017	260,000,000	150,000,000	80,000,000	40,000,000	5,000,000	3,000,000	3,000,000	2,000,000
2018	s	s	170,000,000	100,000,000	51,000,000	2,000,000	1,000,000	24,000,000
2019	s	s	90,000,000	110,000,000	85,000,000	20,000,000	1,000,000	12,000,000
2020	s	s	50,000,000	45,000,000	20,000,000	20,000,000	1,000,000	14,000,000
2021	s	s	60,000,000	50,000,000	35,000,000	20,000,000	1,000,000	25,000,000
2022	s	s	49,979,500	36,979,500	29,979,500	19,979,500	979,500	24,979,500
2023	s	s	69,977,000	49,977,000	36,977,000	19,977,000	977,000	21,977,000
2024	s	s	99,981,000	49,981,000	49,981,000	19,981,000	39,981,000	59,981,000
s Small quantities minted for sets only

== Identifying marks ==
National Identifier	RI
Engravers Initials	Different for each coin
€2 Edge inscription	

== €2 commemorative coins ==
Year	Subject	Volume

50th Anniversary of the signing of the Treaty of Rome (2007)

60th Anniversary of the Universal Declaration of Human Rights (2008)

== See also ==
- Adoption of the euro in Italy
- History of coins in Italy
