= Angelo Sarzetti =

Italian painter

Angelo Sarzetti (1656-1713) was an Italian painter of the Baroque period, active in Rimini. He was a pupil of Carlo Cignani. He painted a San Gaudenzo for the church of San Gaudenzo, Rimini.
