= Francesco Brici =

Italian painter

Francesco Brici (1870-1950) is an Italian painter, born and active in Emilia-Romagna.

He was born in Santarcangelo di Romagna in the province of Rimini. He painted both portraits and sacred subjects. He frescoed the Chapel of the Virgin in the church of San Giovanni Battista, Rimini. Th works depict St Simon Stock receives the Scapular from the Virgin, St Teresa d'Avila, and Eliseo che osserva Elia che ascende al cielo. His altarpiece for the church of San Gaudenzo in Rimini was destroyed in World War II.
