= Basilica of San Gaudenzio =

Church in Novara, Italy

Basilica of Saint Gaudentius
- Basilica di San Gaudenzio
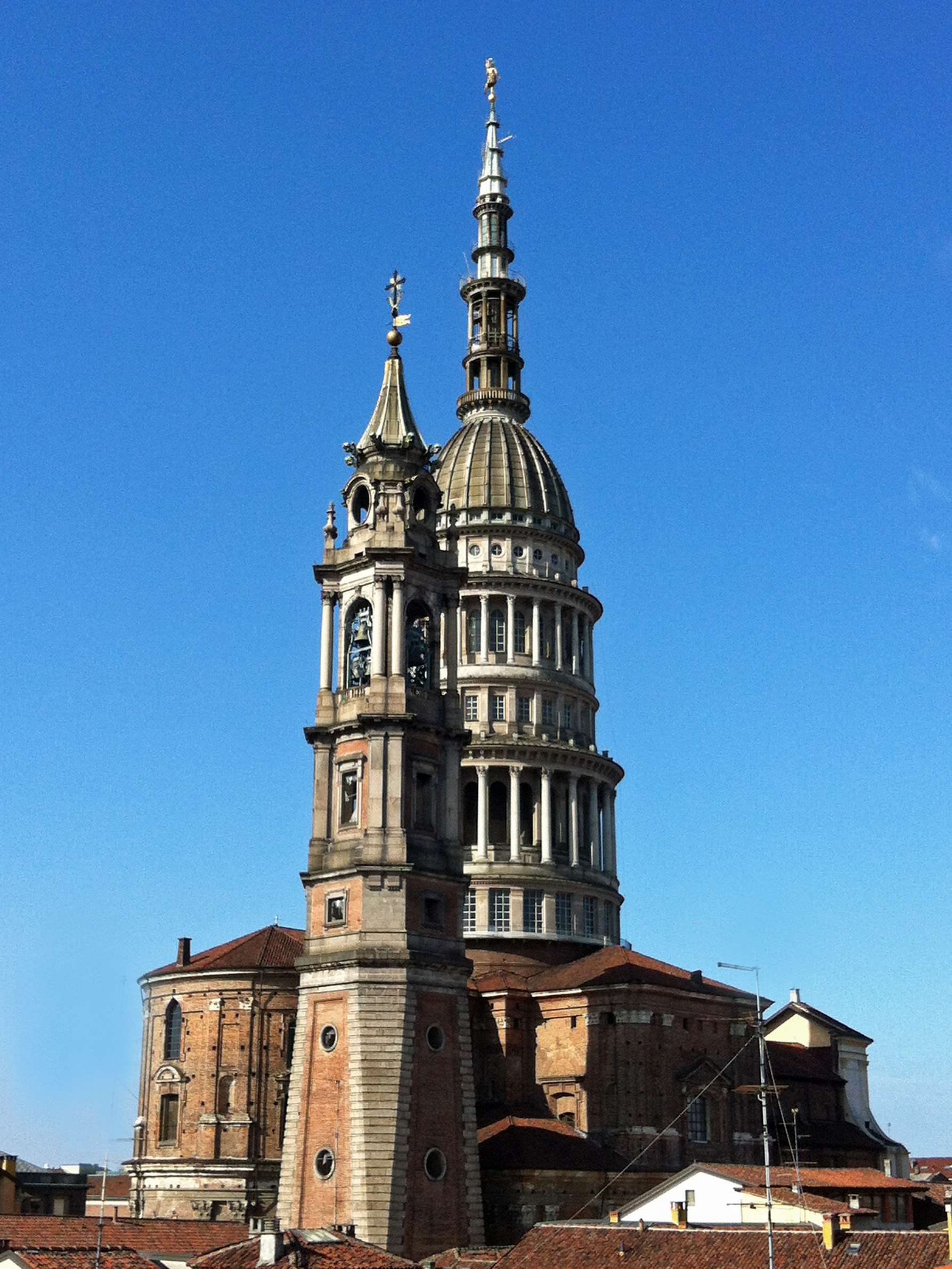
- The Basilica's Campanile and Cupola

Religion
- Affiliation: Roman Catholicism
- Province: Province of Novara
- Region: Piedmont
- Patron: Saint Gaudentius

Location
- Municipality: Novara
- Country: Italy
- Interactive map of Basilica of Saint Gaudentius
- Coordinates: 45°26′59.4″N 8°37′16.2″E

Architecture
- Architects: Pellegrino Tibaldi (basilica); Benedetto Alfieri (campanile); Alessandro Antonelli (cupola)
- Style: Italian Baroque architecture
- Groundbreaking: 1577
- Completed: 1877

Website
- https://www.turismonovara.it/en/ArtandHistoryDetail?Id=125

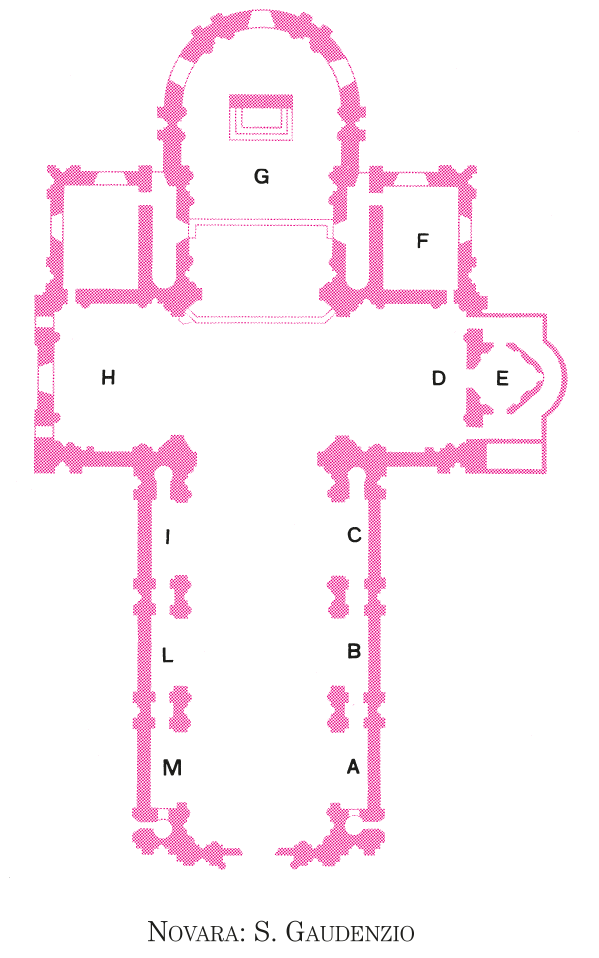
Plan of the church

The Basilica of San Gaudenzio (Italian: Basilica di San Gaudenzio) is a church in Novara, Italy. Its dome, which was designed by Alessandro Antonelli and completed in 1887, is the second-tallest structure built before the 20th century in Italy, after Antonelli's Mole Antonelliana. It is dedicated to Gaudentius of Novara, first bishop of the city.

== History ==
The first church dedicated to the saint existed near the current end of the Via XX Settembre, about 500 meters east of the current site, by 841, it was later rebuilt and reconsecrated in 1298.

From 1552 to 1554, Novara was fortified at the behest of Charles V, and all structures outside the city walls, including the original Basilica, were demolished, however, the emperor quickly opened a brick factory within the city with the goal of eventually rebuilding the church.

Novara was miraculously spared from the second plague pandemic of 1576, and in gratitude for the city's preservation, a site at the highest natural point in the city was chosen as the site for the rebuilt basilica. A Romanesque church, San Vincenzo Martire, already existed at this site, but it was mostly demolished for the new building. However, three chapels of San Vincenzo Martire are preserved in the modern building, including St. George's chapel, where the relics of Gaudentius were stored following the demolition of the original basilica.

The church was designed by Pellegrino Tibaldi, and the cornerstone was laid in May 1577. The church was consecrated on 13 December 1590 by Bishop Cesare Speciano; at this point, the transept and presbytery had not even began construction. The worsening of Novara's economic situation, aggravated by various plagues and wars, halted further construction until 1626. Structural works were mostly completed by 1656. On 11 June 1711, the church was formally completed with the solemn deposition of the relics of Saint Gaudenzio in the reliquary, which had been stored in St. George's Chapel since 1552.

== Campanile and Cupola ==
The Basilica's campanile was built from 1753 to 1786 by Benedetto Alfieri, and rises to a height of 75 meters.

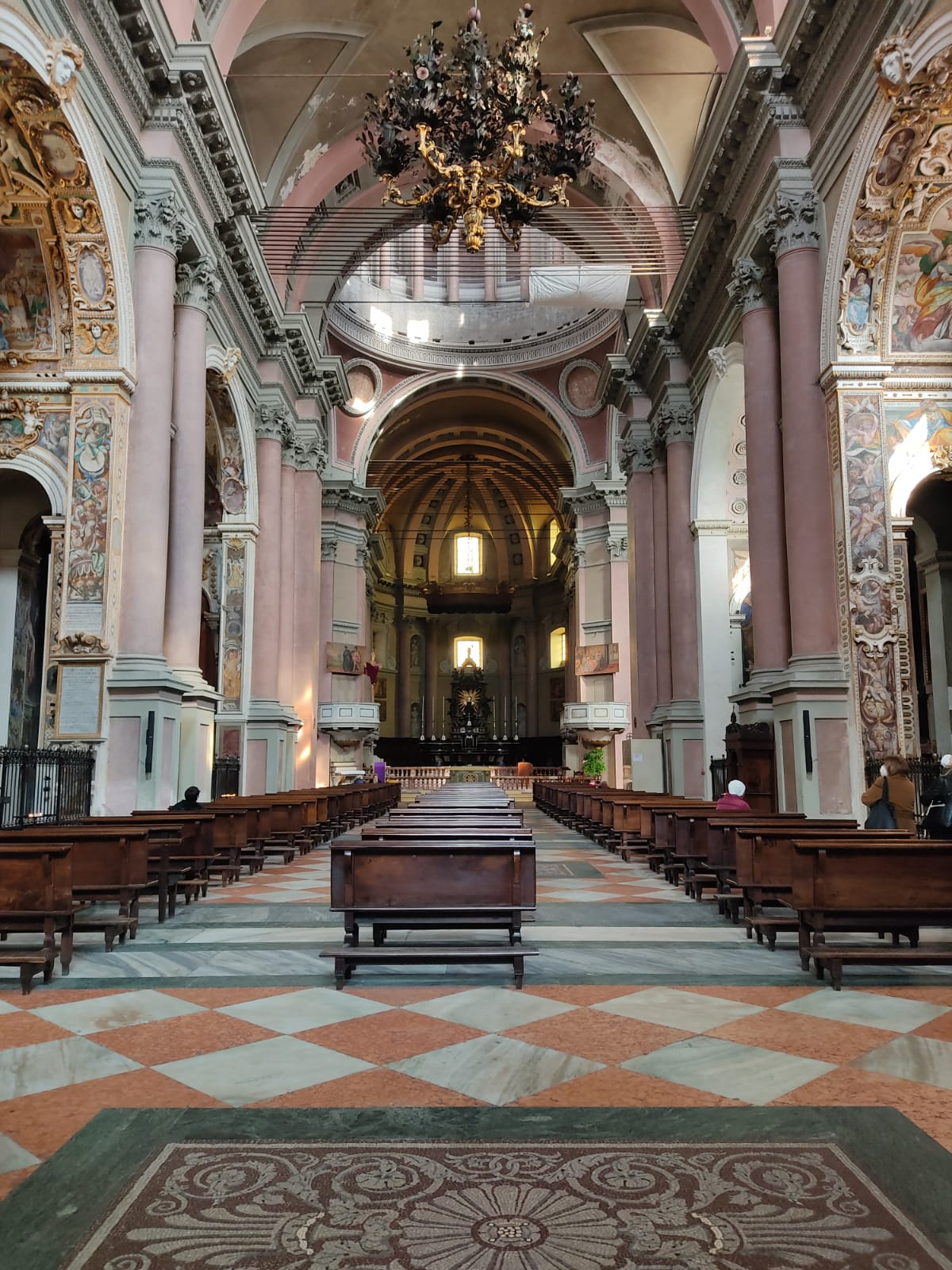
The Basilica's interior

Planning for the Basilica's most notable feature, its huge cupola, began fifty years later, once sufficient funds had been raised for the purpose by an increase in taxes. Alessandro Antonelli was commissioned to design the cupola. The first design was submitted in 1841, and work commenced three years later. Much of the interior structure around the crossing had to be rebuilt to carry the cupola's projected weight, and the project had nothing to show in terms of height when it was interrupted due to the First Italian War of Independence. In 1855, Antonelli submitted an even more ambitious plan than the original, increasing the cupola's projected height from 65 to 75 meters, and by 1858, funds had been mustered to continue works. However, architectural interventions by Antonelli caused costs to balloon to an unacceptable amount, and Antonelli was forced to submit a cheaper plan in 1861. By this time, most of the cupola had already been completed, but the battles over cost had prevented the dome from being built, and Antonelli devoted most of the next ten years to the Mole Antonelliana in Turin. When he returned to the project in 1873, as an esteemed and elderly architect, he was given carte blanche to complete the cupola. It was completed in 1887, and a statue of Christ the Savior was hoisted to the top of the dome on 16 May of the same year.

In the following years the church began to show signs of structural failure under the weight of the cupola, which was, moreover, already discernible during the early stages of construction. Starting in 1881, Antonelli devoted himself to the consolidation of the four load-bearing pillars at the base of the dome and the expansion of the foundations. The work was completed in early 1887, just in time for the feast of the patron saint (January 22).

Over the years there were frequent fears that the dome might collapse, and a major alarm in 1937 caused the monument to be closed for nearly 10 years. During this period reinforced concrete consolidation work was carried out by architect Arturo Danusso to avoid the prospect of the dome falling onto the city; however, recent reexamination of this work reveals that the reinforcement was unnecessary. In the case of structural failure, the dome would collapse in onto itself, rather than topple into the city.

In recent years a series of sophisticated alarm systems have been installed inside the building to monitor any dangers of subsidence, cracks or oscillations. The building, which has become an icon and symbol of Novara, reaches a total height of 121 meters.

== See also ==
Media related to San Gaudenzio (Novara) at Wikimedia Commons

- List of tallest structures built before the 20th century
