= Santa Barbara, Turin =

Church of Santa Barbara Vergine e Martire
- Chiesa di Santa Barbara Vergine e Martire
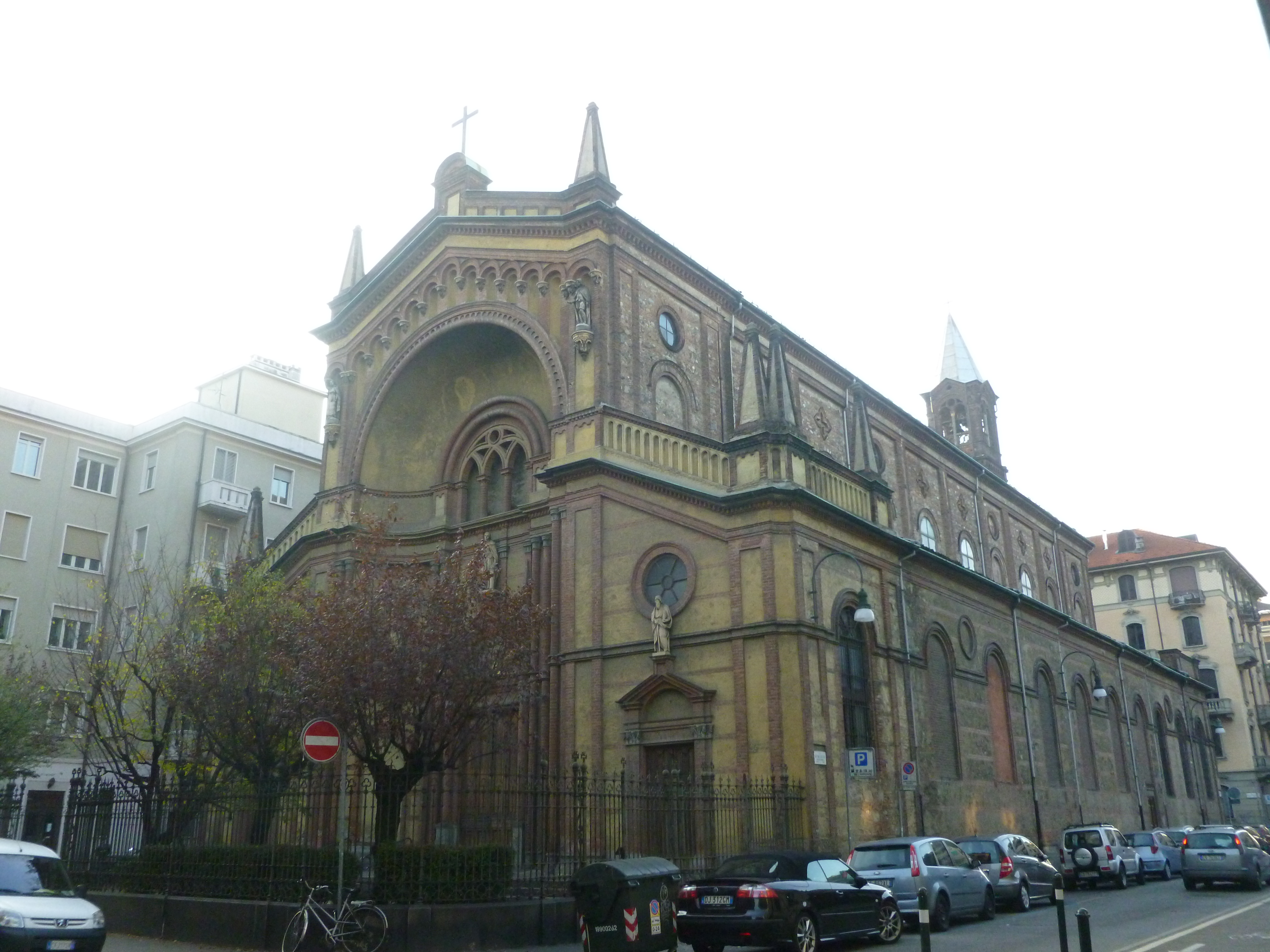
- Façade of the church

- Map of Turin
- 45.07263°N 7.673371°E
- Country: Italy
- Denomination: Roman Catholic Church

History
- Consecrated: 18 April 1869

Architecture
- Style: Eclectic
- Groundbreaking: 1867
- Completed: 1869

Administration
- Archdiocese: Turin

The Church of Santa Barbara Vergine e Martire (Italian: Chiesa di Santa Barbara Vergine e Martire) is a Roman Catholic place of worship, located in the city center of Turin.

== History ==
The church was originally built within the walls of the Citadel of Turin during the 16th century, however, in 1856, it was demolished along with the citadel itself, because it was too small to be able to keep up with the city center's growing population. Santa Barbara was then rebuilt between 1867 and 1869 under the direction of architect Pietro Carrera, who designed the church in an eclectic style. It was then consecrated in April 1869 by Archbishop Alessandro Ricardi di Netro.
