= Alessandro Antonelli =

Italian architect of the 19th century (1798–1888)

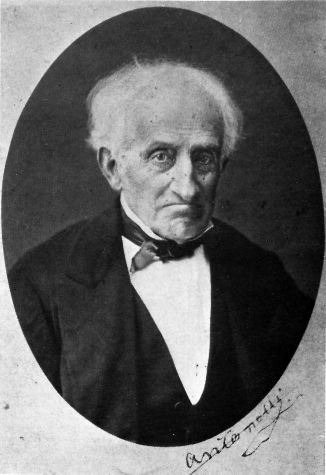

Member of the Chamber of Deputies
- In office 1 February 1849 – 30 March 1849
- Monarch: Victor Emmanuel II

Personal details
- Born: 14 July 1798 Ghemme, French First Republic
- Died: 18 October 1888 (aged 90) Turin, Kingdom of Italy
- Parent(s): Costanzo Antonelli and Angiola Bozzi
- Occupation: Architect; Urban planner
- Education: Polytechnic University of Turin
- Occupation: Architect
- Movement: Neoclassicism
- Buildings: Novara Cathedral; Basilica of San Gaudenzio; Mole Antonelliana

Alessandro Antonelli (14 July 1798 – 18 October 1888) was an Italian architect of the 19th century. He was the most prominent Neoclassical 19th-century architect in Piedmont, with a long and prolific career that included designs for houses, churches and major urban planning schemes. His most famous works are the Mole Antonelliana in Turin, one of the tallest masonry structures ever erected, and both the Novara Cathedral and the Basilica of San Gaudenzio in Novara.

== Biography ==
=== Early life and education ===
Antonelli was born in Ghemme, near Novara. He trained at the Brera Academy, Milan, and the Polytechnic University of Turin, qualifying in 1824. After winning an architecture contest in the Accademia Albertina, he moved to Rome in 1828, where he remained until 1831. During this long period of Classical studies, he elaborated a functional ideal of architecture that profoundly influenced his career.

=== Early career ===
When he returned to Piedmont in 1836 (remaining until 1857), Antonelli was appointed a professor of the Accademia Albertina. He was also elected a deputy in the Kingdom of Sardinia's Parliament, and a member of Turin's communal council and of the Province of Novara's one.

One of his first commissions on his return to Piedmont was the completion of the church of Sant'Agapito, Maggiora. Begun in 1817 by Giuseppe Zanoia, the church was completed in 1838; Antonelli’s work included the portico and the complex Neoclassical interior, with richly coffered, decorated vaults and a dome on pendentives.

His next work was the Santuario del Crocefisso at Boca, near Maggiora. Begun in 1830, the design underwent many revisions and was not completed until 1888. The chapel has an imposing octastyle portico, while the crossing is crowned by a dominating drum constructed externally entirely in brick. The building was slightly modified during its reconstruction after a partial collapse in 1907.

In 1835, Antonelli began building his own house at Maggiora. The completed villa has a monumental façade, comprising a series of superimposed Doric orders, a motif that became characteristic of his domestic work. At the same time, he began his long association with Novara Cathedral, where his first work was a new high altar, with a tetrastyle Corinthian baldachin, and a richly inlaid altar below.

In 1837, Antonelli began to remodel and enlarge the 16th-century church of San Clemente at Bellinzago Novarese, the interior of which anticipated the rebuilt cathedral at Novara. The style is Corinthian, with an elaborate interior including monolithic marble nave columns, rich vaulting and a dome on pendentives. This contrasts with the plain brick exterior, one of Antonelli’s most characteristic features, which allowed him to exploit his interest in the structural properties of brickwork.

=== Mature work ===
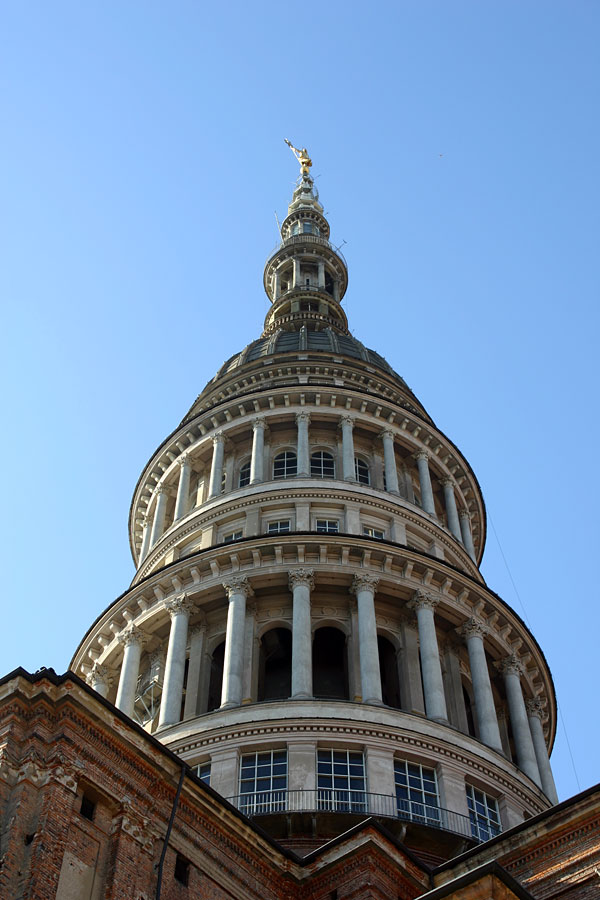
The cupola of the Basilica of San Gaudenzio, symbol of Novara, is 121 metres in height.

In 1841, Antonelli began his own townhouse (Casa Antonelli) on the Corso San Maurizio, Turin, a substantial palazzo in a restrained classical form, with rather flat external modeling, and in the same year, he started another major church project, the Basilica of San Gaudenzio, Novara. The early Baroque church lacked a central dome, and Antonelli’s development of this extraordinary construction occupied him intermittently for the next 40 years.

His first design consisted of a simple dome on a drum, but as his plans developed, the design became taller and more complex. There followed a second, then a third scheme, the latter incorporating two superimposed drums with a crowning dome. What was built was based on a fourth version, which had become yet higher, finally rising 122 m from the ground. Structurally, it was surpassed only by the Mole Antonelliana in Turin, and it stretched the capabilities of brickwork perhaps further than had been attempted since Classical times. The lantern was added in 1872–8.

His next major scheme was the remodelling and enlarging (1850–64) of the Ospedale Maggiore della Carità at Novara; the scheme was formal and highly repetitive, based around large internal courtyards.

During these years, he designed a new cathedral (1854) for Novara; building work began at the west end with a noble atrium, surrounded by an imposing colonnade of unfluted Corinthian columns. The portico to the cathedral itself is richer, with fluted columns and fine classical detailing. This part was completed in 1863, when the medieval cathedral was demolished for the new one (completed 1869), in which Antonelli further developed his themes from Bellinzago, notably in the rich, barrel-vaulted nave.

=== Italian unification ===
In 1854, Antonelli presented a development plan to Turin’s city council. Although he revised it in 1859, it never received formal approval. The city was growing rapidly and in 1861 was declared the capital of united Italy. The essence of the plan was the extension of the city’s already rational grid plan of streets as far as the city walls. It was a formal solution, incorporating such urban features as churches within the axial street pattern.

Also dating from the 1850s is the Casa Ponzio Vaglia in the Corso Matteotti, Turin, a large apartment block on four storeys above a ground-floor colonnade; the detailing is sparse and rational, a simple repetitive urban form. Only half the block was completed. In the late 1850s, Antonelli built the Ospizio degli Orfani at Alessandria and the new church (1856–62) at Borgolavezzaro. The church façade has a broad, tetrastyle portico, the tympanum decorated with low reliefs. The elaborate interior has a barrel-vaulted nave, Corinthian columns to the narrow aisles and painted coffers and vaults.

Another urban planning scheme followed in 1857 with his proposal to connect the town centre of Novara with its new railway station using paired colonnades, terminating in a great formal piazza, although only one block, at Porta Sempione, was executed.

In 1862, he completed his development plan for Ferrara, taking his lead from the grid plan that had formed the basis of Ercole I d'Este’s Addizione Erculea (begun 1492) and extending the pattern further.

=== The Mole Antonelliana ===
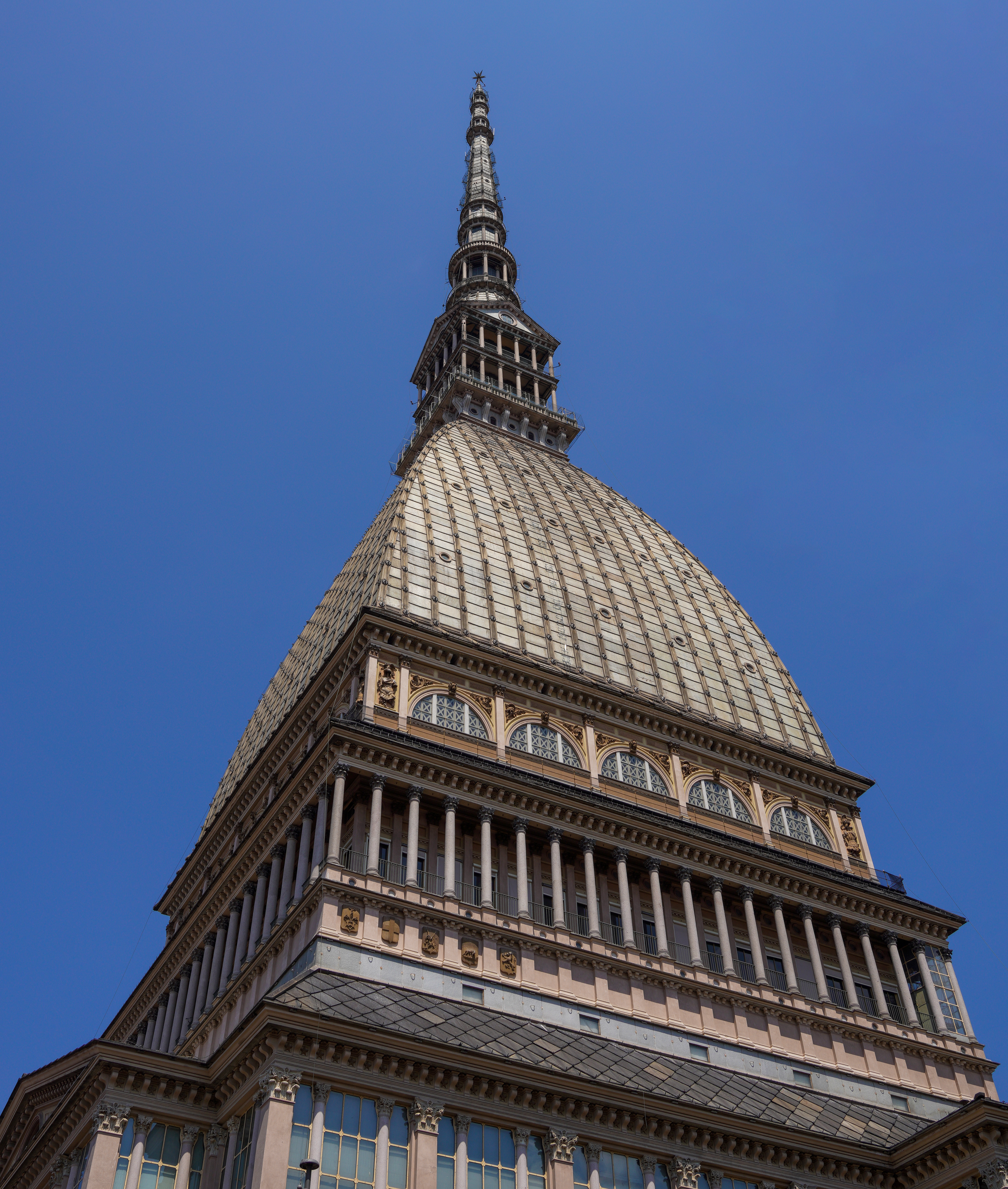
Mole Antonelliana, Turin

In 1863, Antonelli proposed a new cathedral for Alessandria and in the same year, he began his most notable work, the unique building today known as the Mole Antonelliana in the Via Montebello, which has become the symbol of Turin. Structurally developed from the dome of San Gaudenzio, Novara, the completed project was perhaps even more technically daring.

The origins of the building date back to 1860, when the authorities at the Università Israelitica decided to build a large new synagogue. After an unsatisfactory competition, Antonelli was appointed the architect. The extensive vaults and lower storeys, including the main hall, were completed by 1877, when the unfinished structure was bought by the city council, which transformed it into a monument to King Victor Emmanuel II. The great ‘dome’ (49 m high) was begun in 1878 in the unusual form of four curved planes; in 1880 Antonelli designed the lantern (1881–5) surmounting the dome and in 1884 he designed the spire. The final height of this structure is 167.5 m. After Antonelli died, the work was continued by his son Costanzo Antonelli (1844–1923), an engineer, until 1900, when the pinnacle was finally completed. The interior decoration was executed in 1905–8 by Annibale Rigotti. In the 1930s, the tower was strengthened with reinforced concrete, and stabilisation continued in the 1950s. The spire, demolished by a violent cloudburst accompanied by a tornado in 1953, was rebuilt in 1961 according to the original drawings. The Mole occupied much of the last 25 years of Antonelli’s life.

=== Later works ===
In 1874, he began the Asilo Infantile at Bellinzago, a simple, restrained building with an external Doric order, but with the interior (notably the stairs and corridors) in a minimal classical style, devoid of sculptural detail.

His last uncompleted project was a tower for the church at Bellinzago. This represents a reduced version of his great tower at Novara, a simple design with an open, classical bell chamber and above it a tall pinnacle. Antonelli died in 1888 and was buried in the family cemetery of Maggiora.

== Legacy ==
Antonelli’s productive career incorporated several diverse elements. His urban planning schemes are formal solutions with grand colonnades; his churches, too, are rich, usually Corinthian Neoclassical works. The villas are simpler, usually Doric and often of Palladian derivation. Structural inventiveness, however, was his most remarkable quality. His desire to exploit masonry to its structural limits reached its peak at the Mole and San Gaudenzio, building to heights rarely achieved before. It is a measure of his success that both great structures have since become the symbols of their respective cities.

Antonelli represents the survival of Neoclassicism, fused with the scientific spirit of enquiry of the Polytechnic University and of the new profession of the structural engineer.

== Selected works ==
- Villa Caccia, Romagnano Sesia
- Chiesa dei Santi Bartolomeo e Gaudenzio, Borgolavezzaro
- Basilica di San Gaudenzio, Novara
- Casa Bossi, Novara
- Novara Cathedral
- Ospedale Maggiore della Carità, Novara
- San Clemente, Bellinzago Novarese
- Ospizio degli Orfani, Alessandria
- Casa Antonelli, Turin
- Casa Ponzio Vaglia, Turin
- Casa Scaccabarozzi, Turin
- Mole Antonelliana, Turin
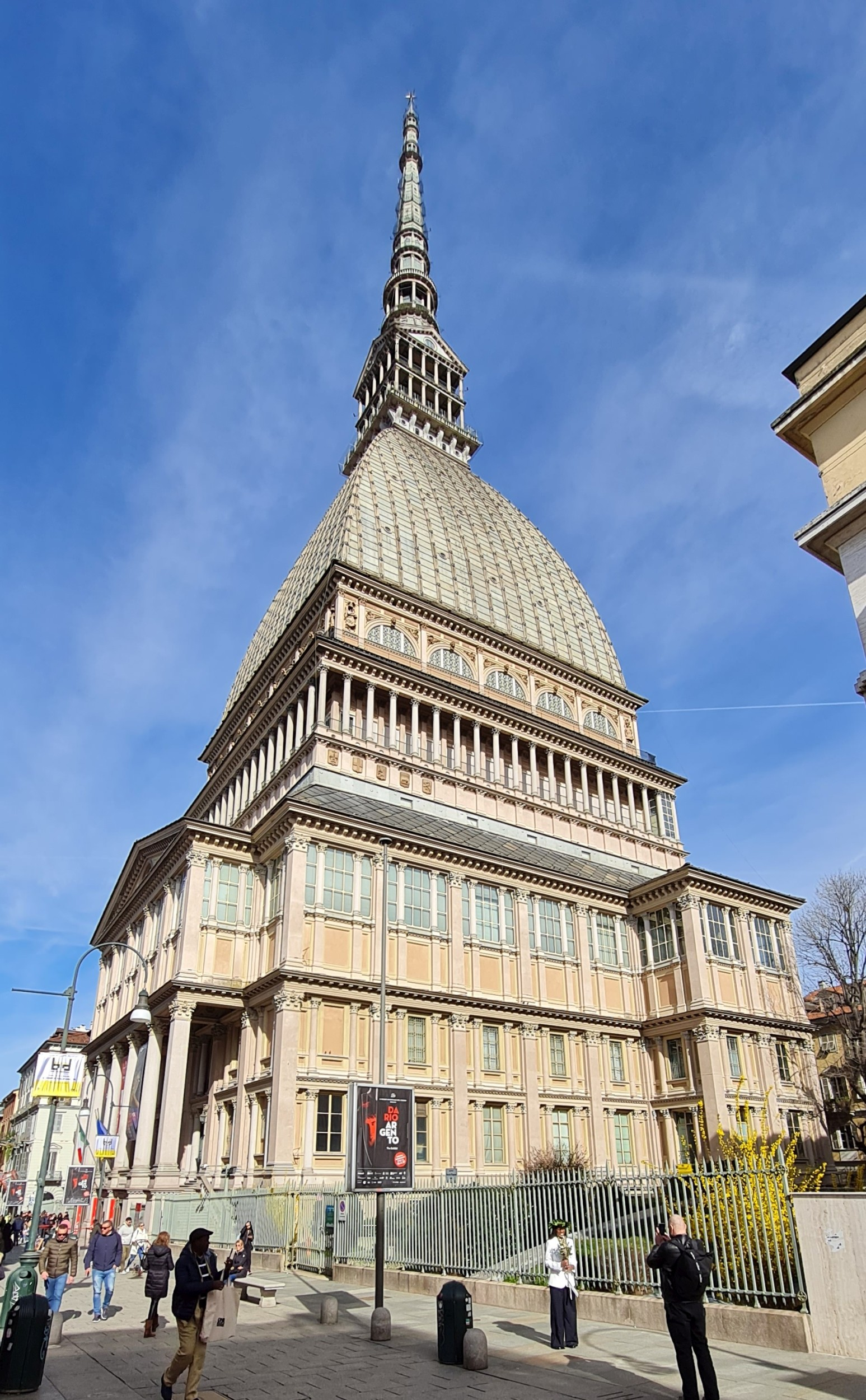
Mole Antonelliana

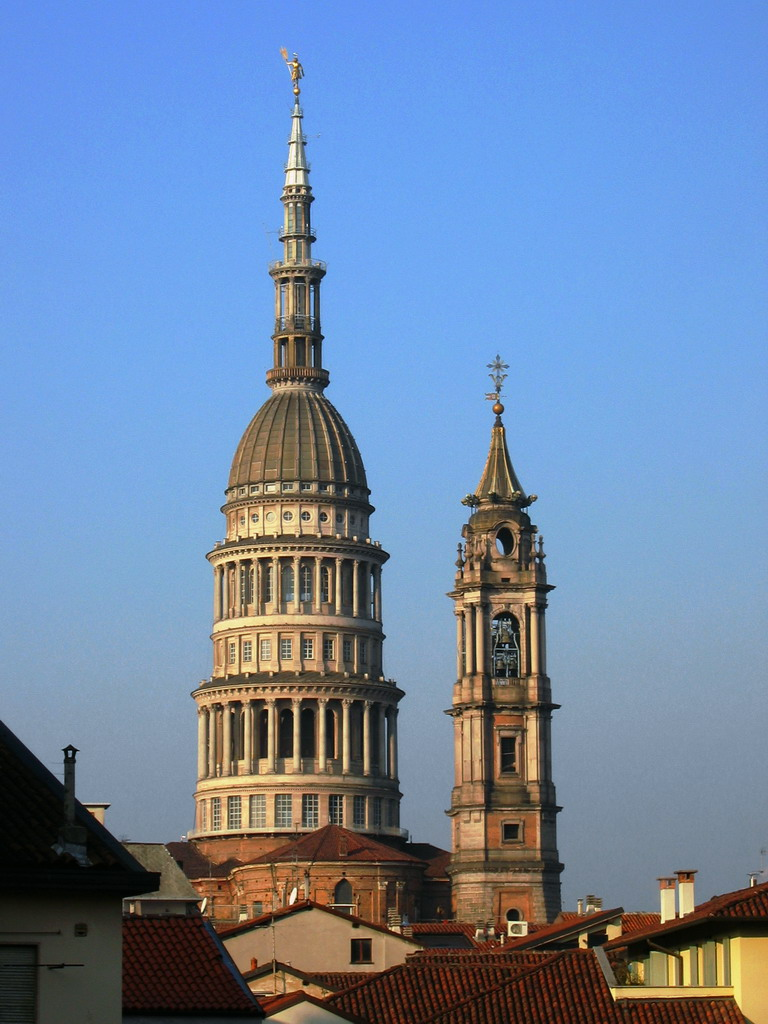
Dome of San Gaudenzio, Novara

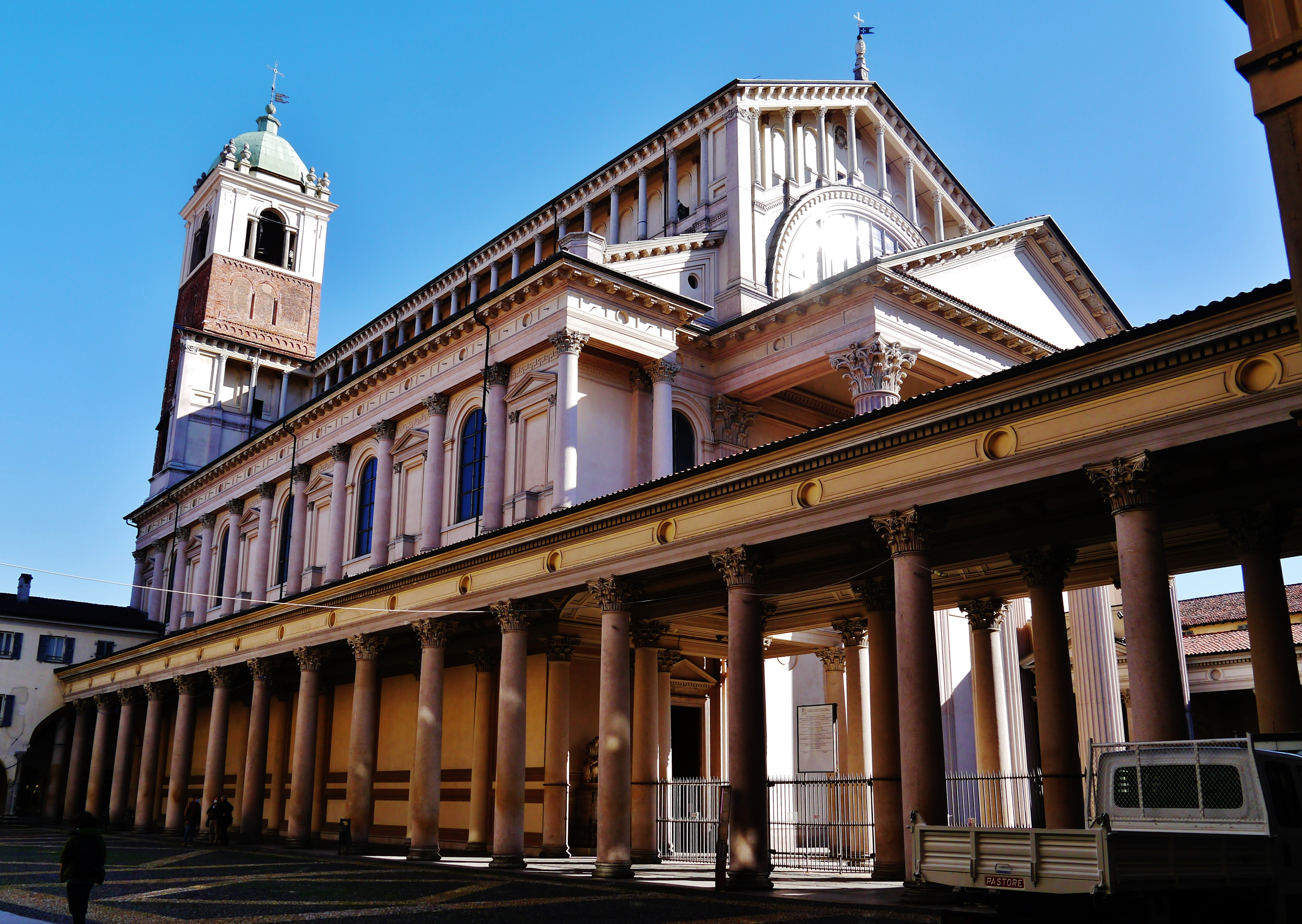
Novara Cathedral

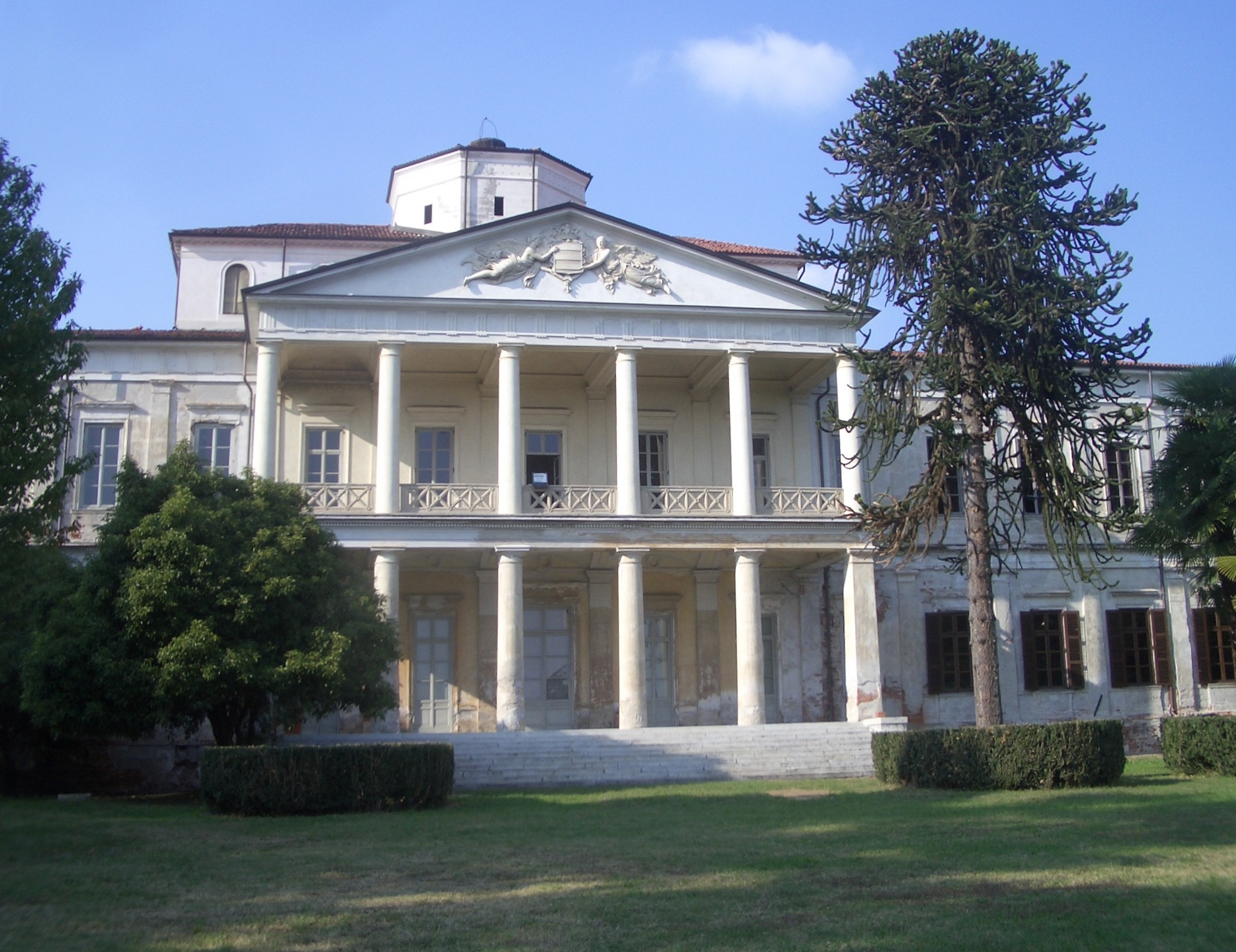
Villa Caccia, Romagnano Sesia

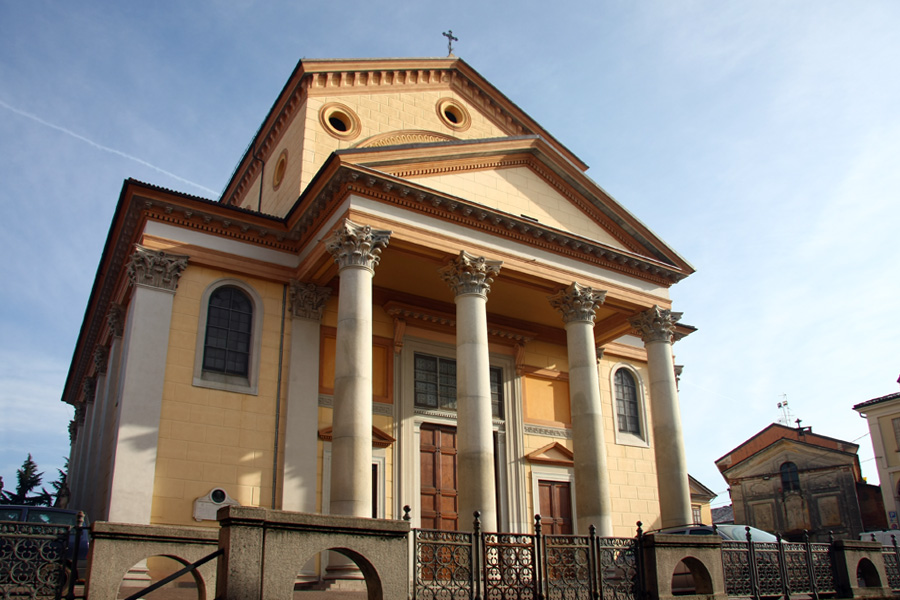
Chiesa dei Santi Apostoli Pietro e Paolo, Oleggio

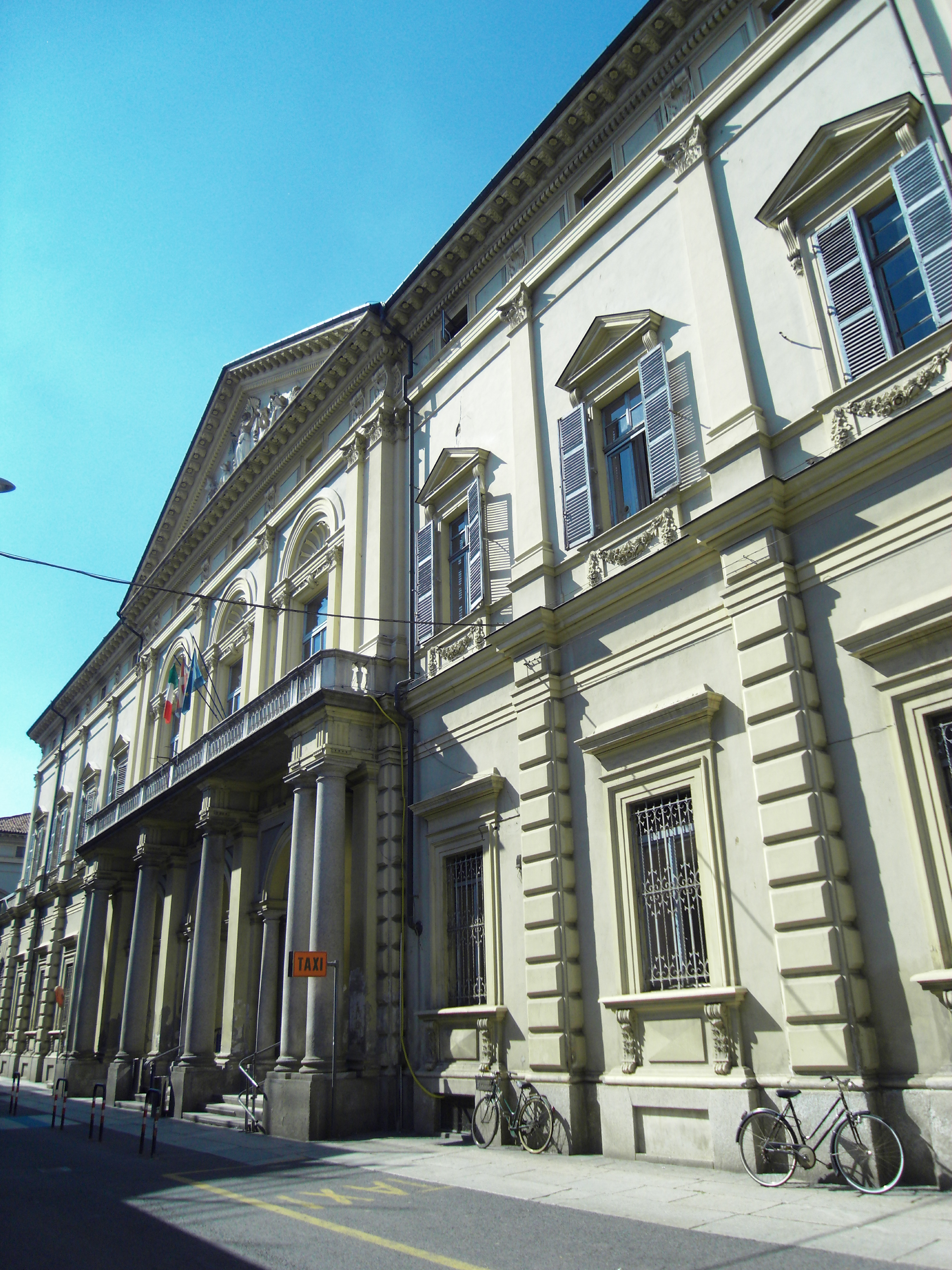
Ospedale Santi Antonio e Biagio di Alessandria

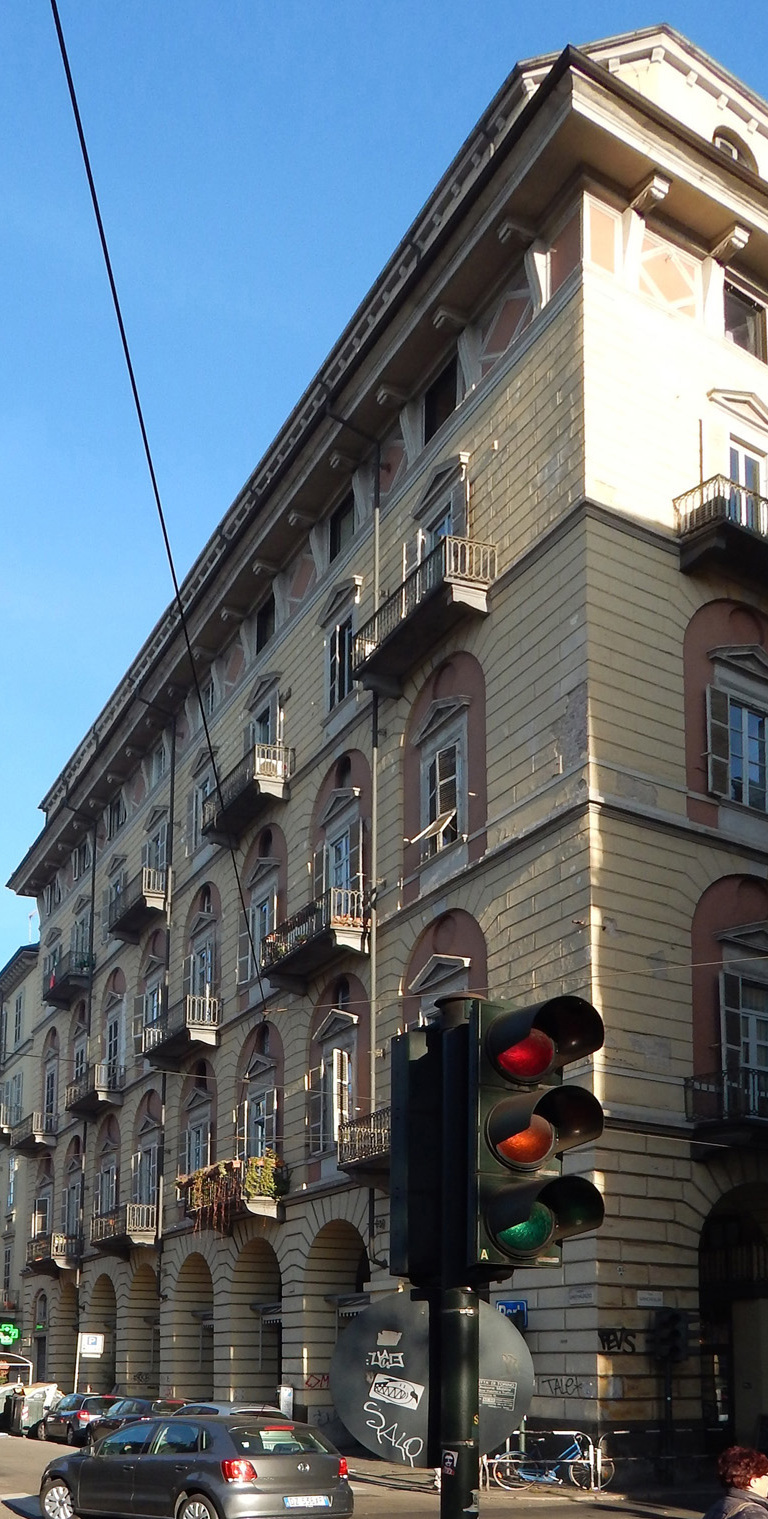
Casa Antonelli

== Bibliography ==
- Chevalley, Giovanni (1929). "ANTONELLI, Alessandro". Enciclopedia Italiana. Rome: Istituto dell'Enciclopedia Italiana.
- Gregotti, Vittorio; Rossi, Aldo (1957). "L'influenza del romanticismo europeo nell'architettura di Alessandro Antonelli". Casabella Continuità. 214: 62–81.
- Rosso, Franco (1989). Alessandro Antonelli 1798-1888. Milan: Electa. ISBN 88-435-2848-3.
