= San Gaudenzo, Rimini =

Church building in Rimini, Italy

Coordinates: 44.0568°N 12.5642°E

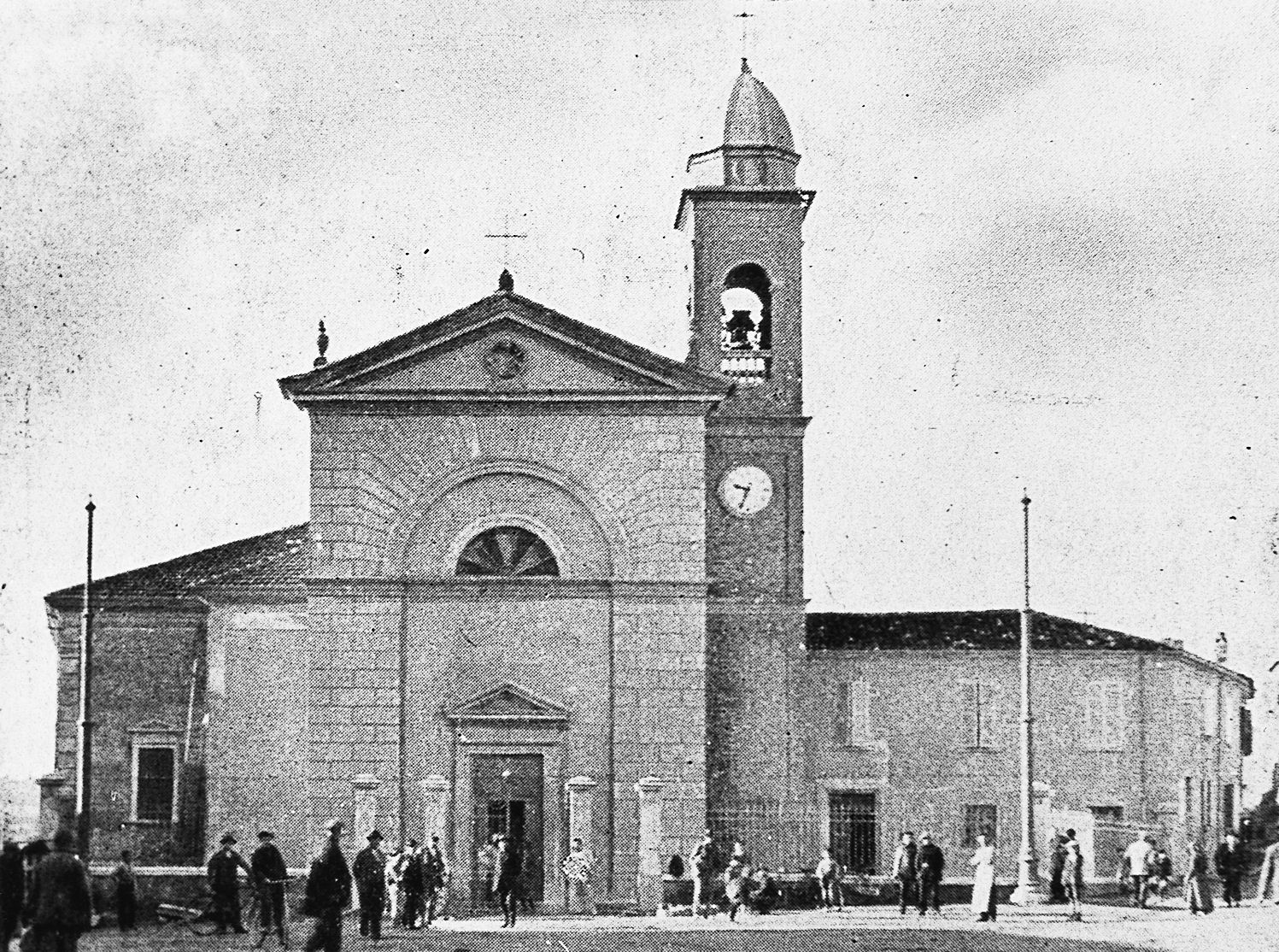
Church of San Gaudenzo, Rimini, with pre 1943 façade

San Gaudenzo is a 20th-century Roman Catholic parish church in the Rimini region of Emilia-Romagna Italy.

The original parish church was erected in 1856 using designs by Filippo Morolli, but it was destroyed during World War II. The reconstruction, while modeled on the prior church, is a modern reinterpretation, completed in 1950, by the architect Luigi Campanini. Many of the prior artworks were destroyed, including a canvas by Francesco Brici depicting San Gaudenzo. The church now houses a canvas by Angelo Sarzetti, originally in a Convent of Rimini. The portal has a sculptural group depicting San Gaudenzo blessing by Elio Morri (1913-1992).
