= Mole Antonelliana =

Landmark building in Turin, Italy

Coordinates: 45°04′08″N 7°41′35″E

- The Mole in June 2026
- Interactive map of the Mole Antonelliana area

General information
- Location: Turin, Italy
- Current tenants: National Museum of Cinema
- Construction started: 1863
- Completed: 1889; 137 years ago
- Renovated: 1953

Height
- Architectural: 167.5 metres (550 ft)

Design and construction
- Architect: Alessandro Antonelli

The Mole Antonelliana (pronounced [ˈmɔːle antonelˈljaːna]) is a major landmark building in Turin, Italy, named after its architect, Alessandro Antonelli. A mole in Italian is a building of monumental proportions.

Construction began in 1863, soon after Italian unification, and was completed in 1889, after the architect's death. Originally conceived of as a synagogue, it now houses the National Museum of Cinema, and is believed to be the tallest museum in the world. A representation of the building is featured on the obverse of the Italian 2 euro cent coin. Catalan vaults are featured in the ceiling of the ground floor under the atrium, which are relatively rare in Italy but popular in Spain, where they originated.

== History ==
=== Construction ===
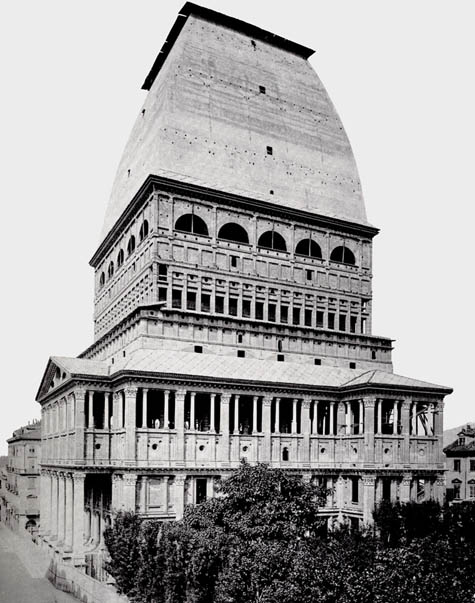
Photograph showing the Mole with a temporary dome, in 1875

The building was conceived and constructed as a synagogue. The Jewish community of Turin had enjoyed full civil rights since 1848, and at the time the construction of the synagogue began, Turin was the capital of the new Italian state, a position it held only from 1860 to 1864. The community, with a budget of 250,000 lire and the intention of having a building worthy of a capital city, hired Alessandro Antonelli. Antonelli had recently added a 121 m (397 ft) dome and spire to the seventeenth-century Basilica of San Gaudenzio in Novara and promised to build a synagogue for 280,000 lire.

The relationship between Antonelli and the Jewish community was not happy. He proposed a series of modifications which raised the final height to 167.5 m (550 ft), over 46 m (151 ft) higher than the dome in the original design. Such changes, in addition to greater costs and construction time than were originally anticipated, did not please the Jewish community and construction was halted in 1869, with a provisional roof.

With the transfer of the Italian capital to Florence in 1864, the community shrank, but costs and Antonelli's ambition continued to rise. In 1876, the Jewish community, which had spent 692,000 lire for a building that was still far from finished, announced that it was withdrawing from the project. The people of Turin, who had watched the synagogue rise skyward, demanded that the city take over the project, which it did. An exchange was arranged between the Jewish community and the city of Turin for a piece of land on which a handsome Moorish Revival synagogue was quickly built. The Mole was dedicated to Victor Emmanuel II. Antonelli resumed construction, increasing the height to 146 m (479 ft), 153 m (502 ft), and finally 167.5 m (550 ft). He worked on the project until his death in October 1888.

Antonelli's original vision for the spire was to top it off with a five-pointed star, but he later opted for a statue instead, depicting an angel, or "genio alato"—one symbol of the House of Savoy. The statue was commissioned to the sculptor Fumagalli, months after Antonelli's death. The design included an embossed and gilded copper genie holding a lance in one hand and a palm branch in the other. On its head was a small five-pointed star supported by a pole. When the star was set in its place on 10 April 1889, it brought the total height of the Mole to 167.5 m (550 ft), making it the tallest brick building in Europe at the time.

From 1908 to 1938, the city used the Mole to house its Museum of the Risorgimento, which was moved to the Palazzo Carignano in 1938.

The Mole Antonelliana is the tallest unreinforced brick building in the world (built without a steel girder skeleton).

=== Repairs ===
On 11 August 1904, a violent storm caused the winged genie to collapse, but it stayed suspended against one of the terraces of the structure. Following reconstruction work, it was replaced by a 5-pointed star made of copper and measuring 4 meters in diameter. The design, by Ernesto Ghiotti, was similar to the original one seen on the head of the genie, and fell in 1953: it has been later replaced by a smaller three-dimensional, 12-pointed star.

During the Second World War, the building largely escaped the bombings of 6 December 1942, which hit many military targets in nearby Via Verdi, and destroyed the neighbouring Teatro di Torino.

On 23 May 1953, a violent cloudburst, accompanied by a tornado, destroyed the uppermost 47 m (154 ft) of the pinnacle, which was rebuilt in 1961 as a metal structure faced with stone. Guido Chiarelli carried out the project for the lighting of the pinnacle, at the end of the reconstruction work.

=== Present ===
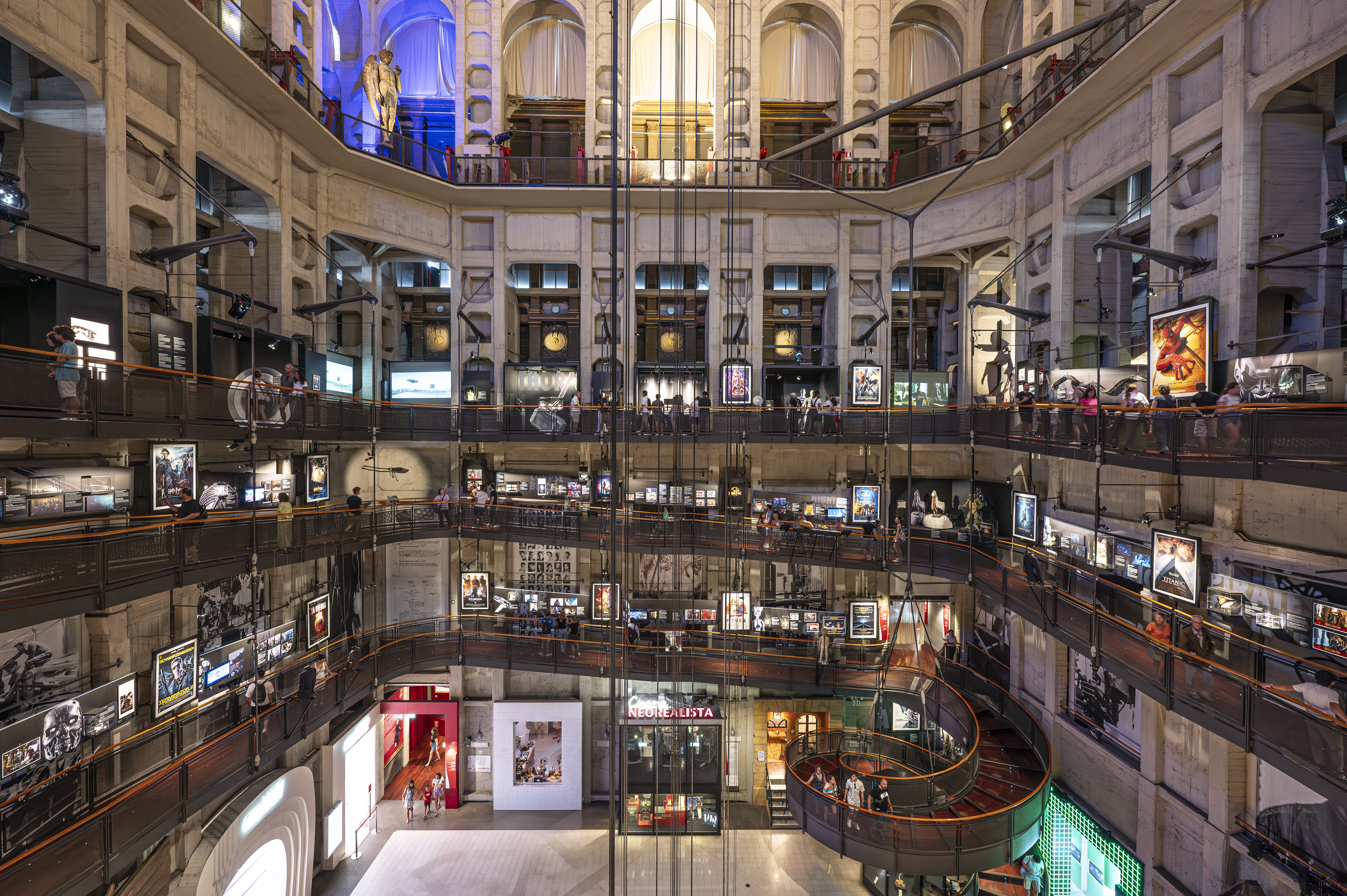
Since 2000, the Mole Antonelliana building has housed the National Museum of Cinema.

Since 2000, the building has housed the National Museum of Cinema. The Mole appears on the reverse of the two-cent Italian euro coins and was the inspiration for the official emblem of the 2006 Winter Olympics, as well as those of the 2005 World Bocce Championships and the 2006 World Fencing Championships.

The building also lent its name to one of Italian football's oldest derbies, the Derby della Mole, between Turin football clubs Torino and Juventus.

On one side of the four-faced dome, the first Fibonacci numbers are written with red neon lights: they are part of the artistic work Il volo dei Numeri (Flight of the Numbers) by Mario Merz.

In December 2017, the Mole was illuminated with over 6000 LED lights, an unprecedented event to mark 110 years since the establishment of Aem Torino, Iren, a company that supplies electricity to the city.

== In popular culture ==
Friedrich Nietzsche greatly admired the building, associating it with the figure Zarathustra and wrote, "Earlier I walked past the Mole Antonelliana, perhaps the most brilliant work of architecture ever built—strangely, it has no name—as a result of an absolute drive into the heights—it recalls nothing so much as my Zarathustra. I baptized it Ecce homo and in that spirit placed an enormous free space around it."

The Mole was featured in the fourth leg of the American reality competition show The Amazing Race 20.

The building (including the interior with its Museum of Cinema) was used extensively in the 2004 Italian film Dopo Mezzanotte (After Midnight).

A stylized version of the building appeared in the logo for the 2006 Winter Olympics.

The mascot of the 2025 Special Olympics Winter Games, Moly, is an otter with a hat shaped like the Mole.

The landmark lends its name (Derby della Mole) to the derby between the city's two Serie A football clubs, Torino F.C. and Juventus F.C..

== Gallery ==
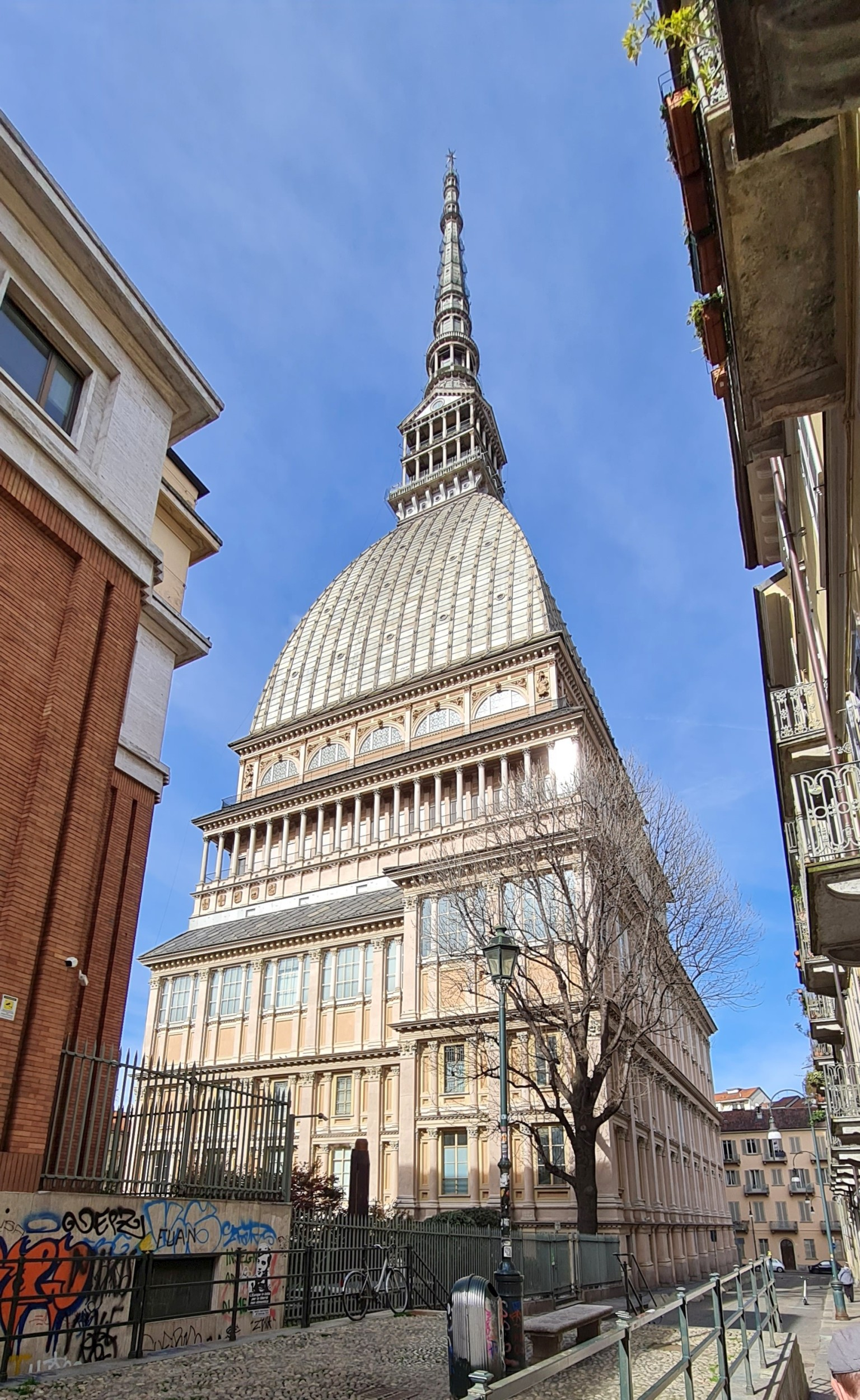

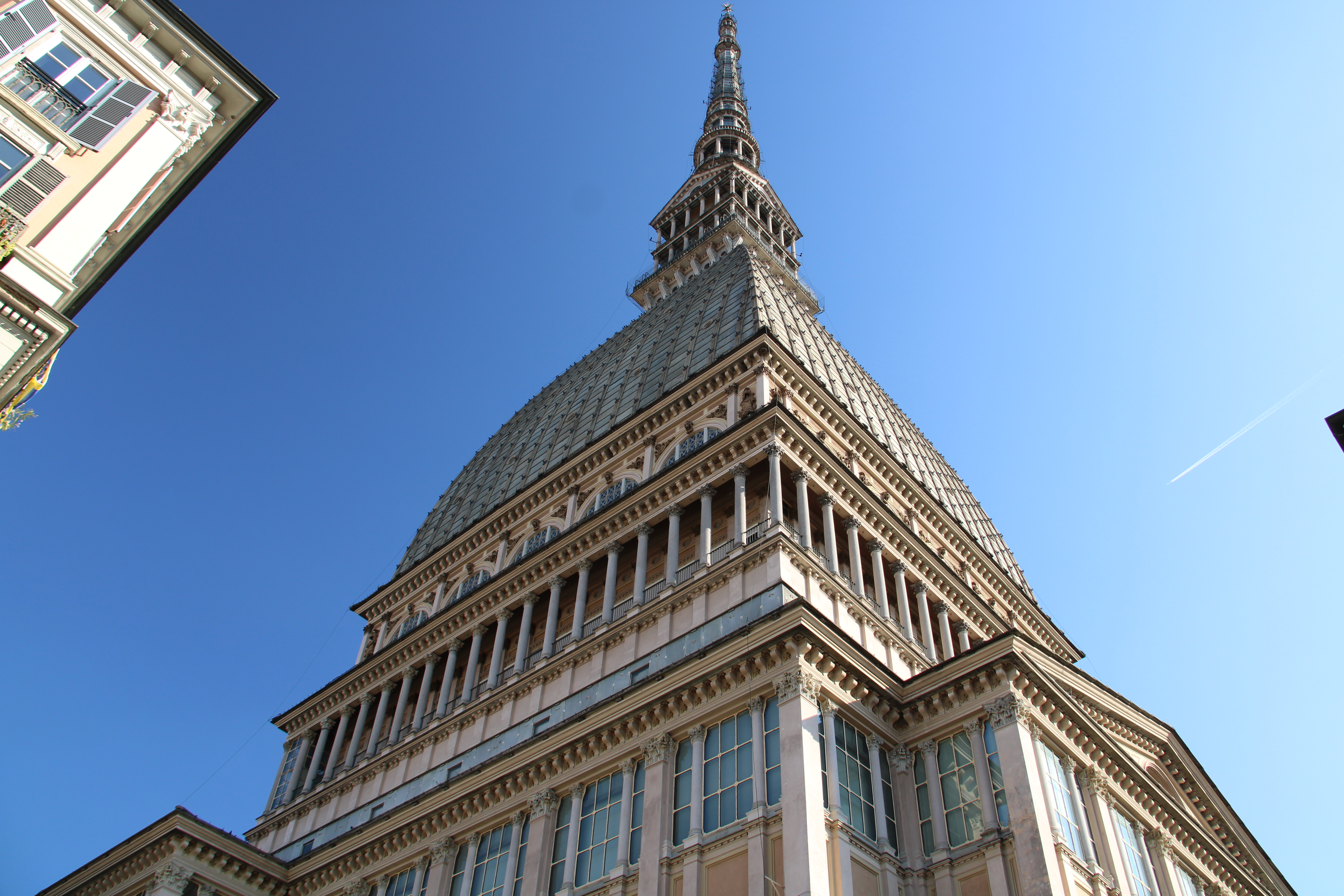

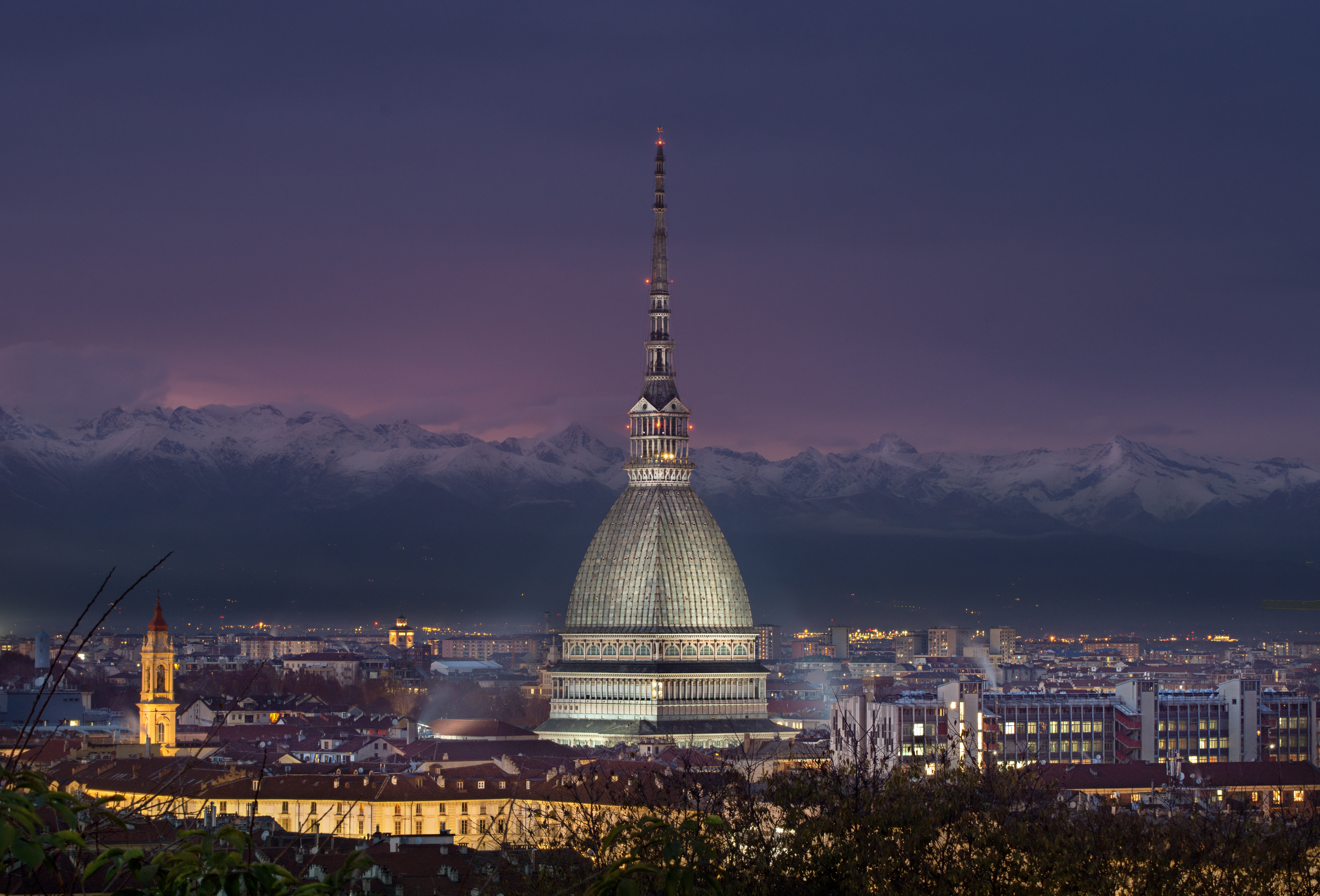
Night view of the building

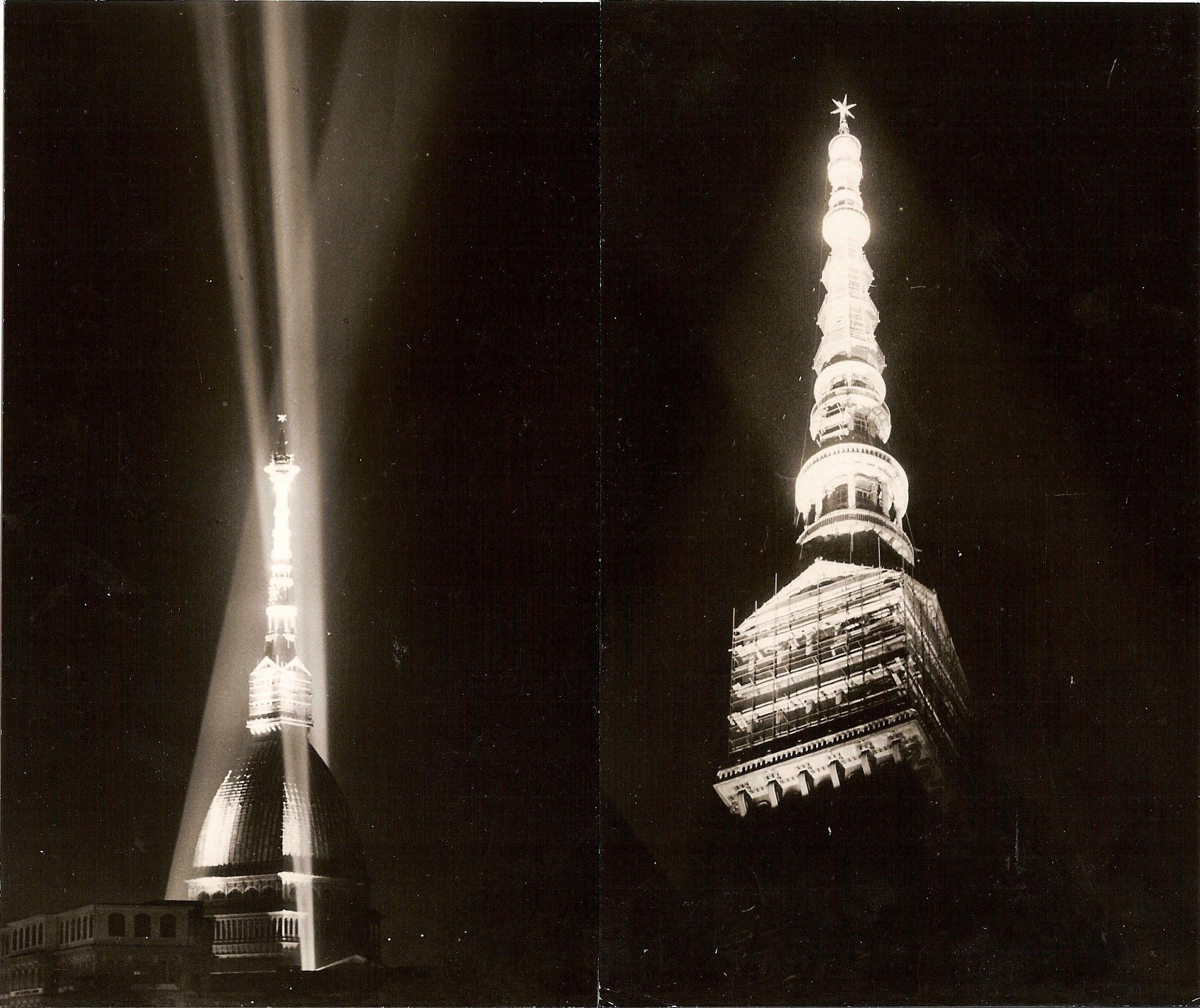
Project for the lighting of Mole Antonelliana in 1961

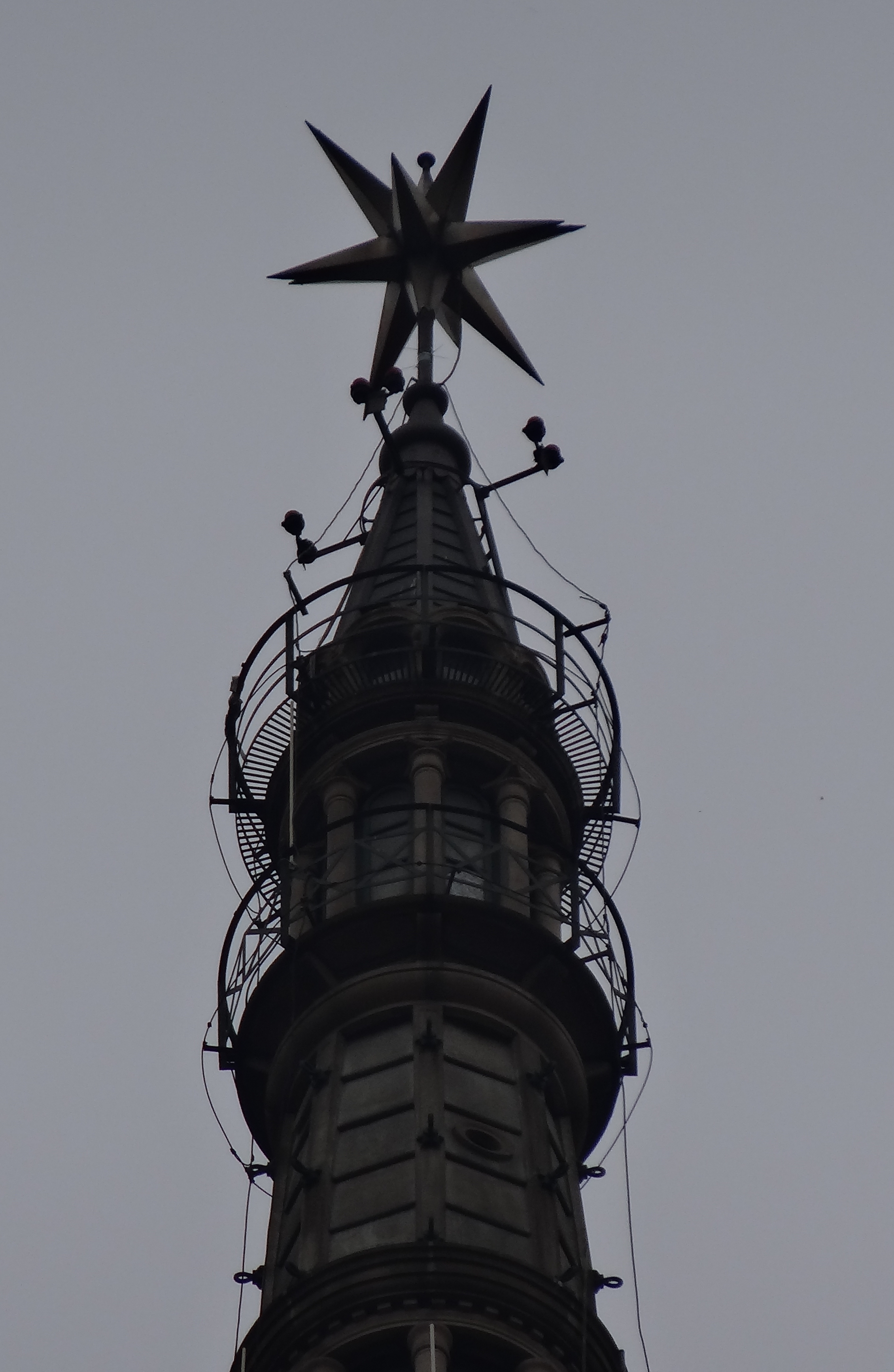
Star on the summit

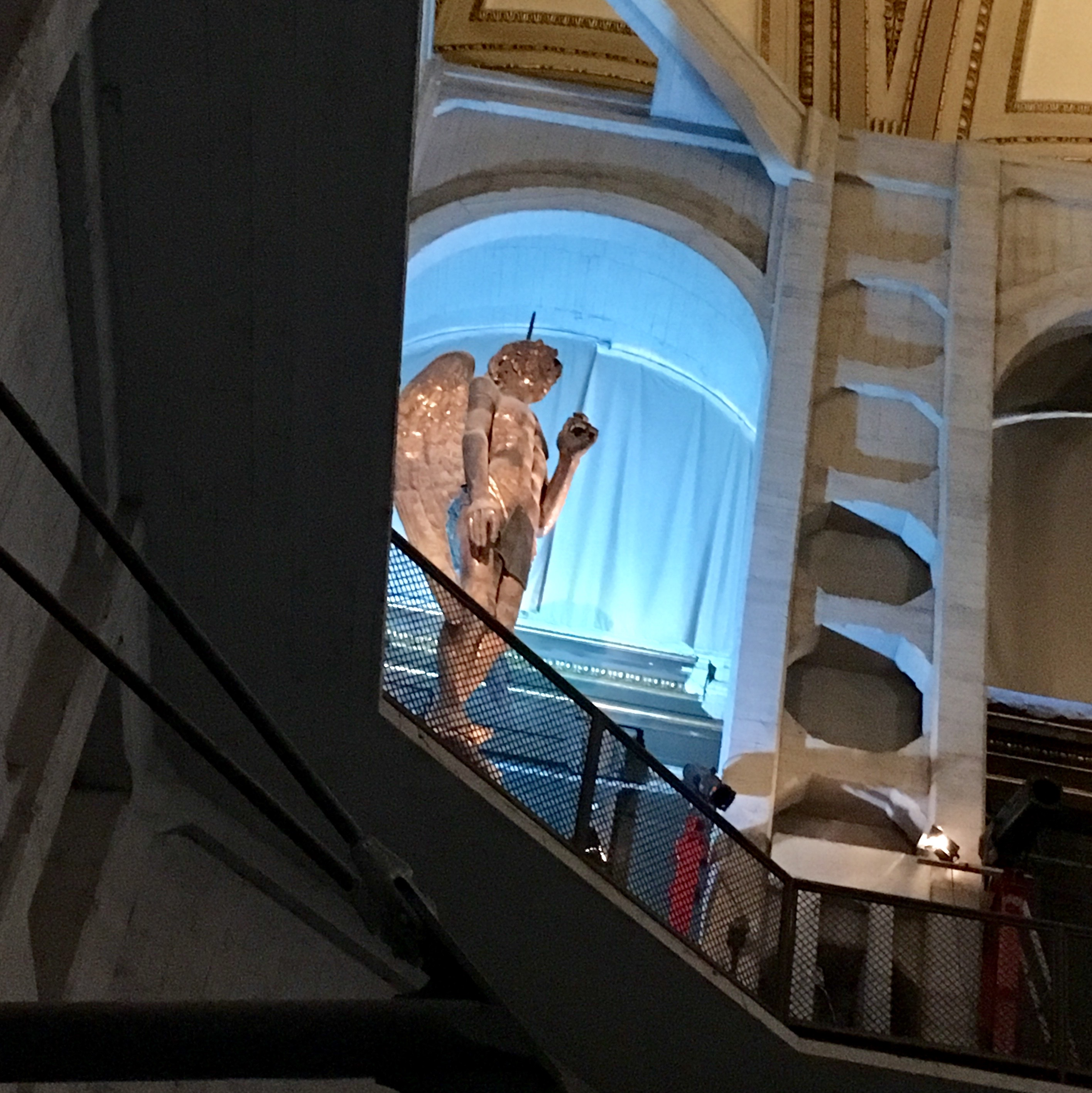
The Genio Alato on display within the Mole

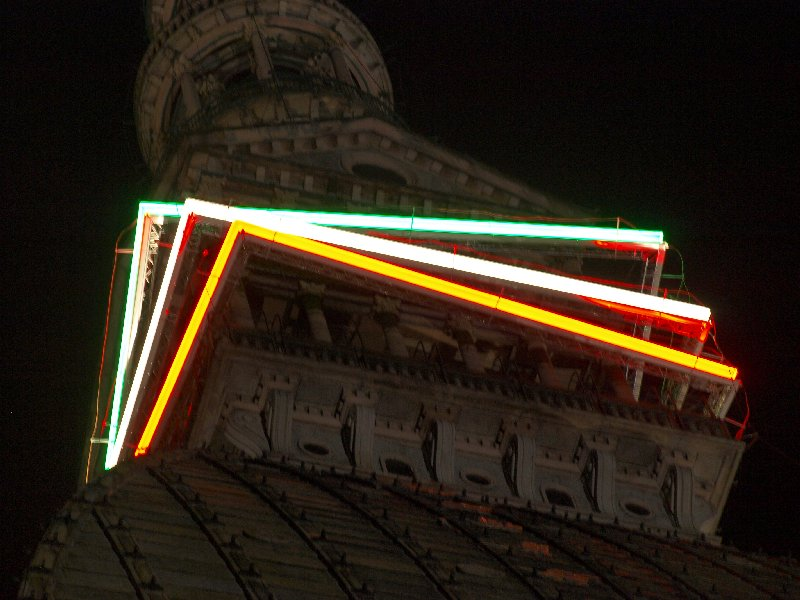
Decorated in national colours for the 150th anniversary of Italian unification

Decorated in LED lights for the 110th anniversary of the establishment of Aem/Iren

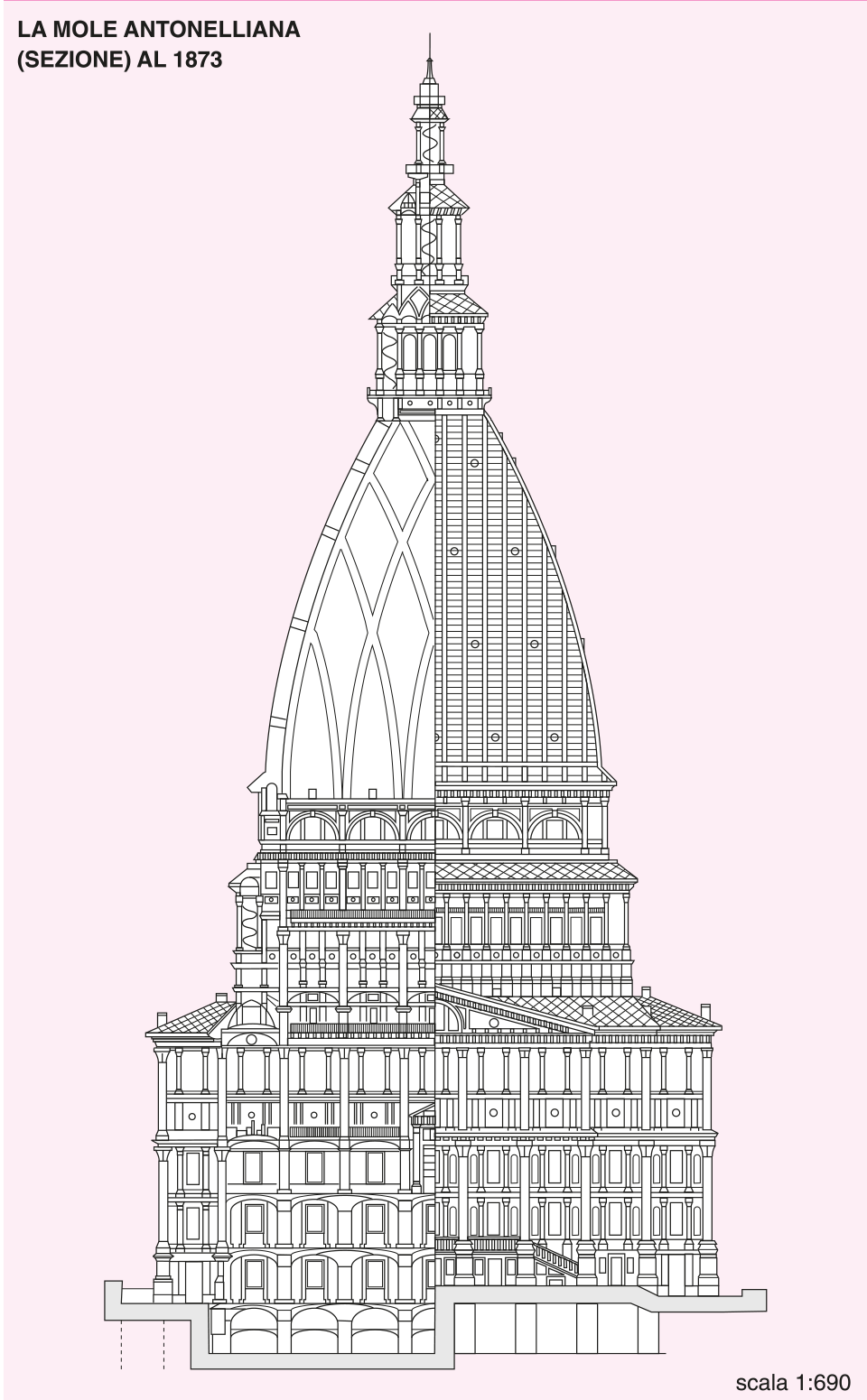
Section

== See also ==
- List of tallest structures built before the 20th century
