= Gaudentius of Brescia =

Italian Catholic bishop

Saint Gaudentius

Bishop of Brescia
- Born: Brescia
- Died: c. 410
- Venerated in: Roman Catholic Church
- Canonized: Pre-Congregation
- Feast: October 25
- Attributes: Bishop's vestment Miter; Crosier

Gaudentius (Italian: San Gaudenzio di Brescia; died 410) was Bishop of Brescia from 387 until 410, and was a theologian and author of many letters and sermons. He was the successor of Philastrius.

== Biography ==
Gaudentius had studied under Philastrius, and was a preacher in Italy and the Middle East. Unlike many Christians of his day, Gaudentius was thoroughly conversant in both Greek and Hebrew as well as his native Latin. When Philastrius died around 387, the people of Brescia elected Gaudentius as bishop –evidently against his will. He was on pilgrimage to Jerusalem when Philastrius had died. The Catholic Encyclopedia states that “the people of Brescia bound themselves by an oath that they would accept no other bishop than Gaudentius; and Ambrose and other neighboring prelates, in consequence, obliged him to return, though against his will. The Eastern bishops also threatened to refuse him Communion if he did not obey.”

Gaudentius was consecrated by Ambrose in 387. A record of the discourse given made by Gaudentius on the occasion of his consecration survives. Gaudentius reported upon his consecration that he had brought back with him from the Holy Land relics of John the Baptist, the Apostles, relics of saints from Milan, and of the Forty Martyrs of Sebaste. The nieces of Basil of Caesarea had given him the relics of the Forty Martyrs at Caesarea in Cappadocia.

He deposited these relics in a basilica that he named Concilium Sanctorum, and wrote a sermon upon its dedication.

== Writings ==
Twenty-one tractates attributed to Gaudentius survive. He also wrote many pastoral letters and ten of his sermons have survived. Gaudentius' erudition together with his knowledge of both Greek and Hebrew earned him a reputation as a sophisticated and eloquent preacher.

His Easter sermons were written down at the request of the Brescian nobleman Benivolus, who had been too ill to listen to Gaudentius speak.

== Defense of John Chrysostom ==
Gaudentius and the Archbishop of Constantinople, John Chrysostom, were friends; the two may have met at Antioch.

Gaudentius joined a delegation in 405 sent by Innocent I and Honorius to defend Chrysostom. The delegation was sent to speak with the Eastern Emperor Arcadius to defend Chrysostom after the latter had been accused by the member of what was considered a heretical sect, and exiled.

Gaudentius and his companions, two bishops, encountered many difficulties and never reached their goal of entering Constantinople. At the start of their journey Gaudentius and his two companions had been seized at Athens. They were sent to Constantinople, a journey of three days on a ship without food.

However, they were not allowed to enter the city, and were imprisoned in the fortress of Athyra, in Thrace.

An attempt to bribe them into speaking with Archbishop Atticus of Constantinople, the man who had replaced Chrysostom, failed, but one of the thumbs of the three travelers was broken during a scuffle in which Byzantine officials had seized the bishops’ credentials by force.

Gaudentius and his two companions were then put on board an unseaworthy vessel; it was alleged that the ship's captain had orders to wreck them.

The travelers arrived safely, however, at Lampsacus. They departed for Italy and arrived at Otranto after twenty days. Despite the failure of the mission, Chrysostom sent a letter of thanks to Gaudentius.

Palladius of Galatia preserved an account by Gaudentius of his four-month adventure (Dialogus, 4).

== Veneration ==
Gaudentius's relics were kept at Brescia in the church of San Giovanni, built on the site of the ancient Concilium Sanctorum.

Gaudentius was depicted in altar-pieces by painters of Brescia, including Moretto, Savoldo, and Romanino.
