= Giovanni Battista Pinardi =

Italian Roman Catholic prelate

Venerable Giovanni Battista Pinardi
- Auxiliary Bishop of Turin
- Church: Roman Catholic Church
- Archdiocese: Turin
- See: Turin
- Appointed: 24 January 1916
- Term ended: 2 August 1962
- Other post: Titular Bishop of Eudoxias (1916-62)

Orders
- Ordination: 29 June 1903 by Agostino Richelmy
- Consecration: 5 March 1916 by Costanzo Castrale

Personal details
- Born: Giovanni Battista Pinardi; 15 August 1880 Castagnole Piemonte, Turin, Kingdom of Italy
- Died: 2 August 1962 (aged 81) Turin, Italy
- Buried: Church of San Secondo, Turin, Italy

Sainthood
- Venerated in: Roman Catholic Church
- Title as Saint: Venerable
- Attributes: Episcopal attire

Giovanni Battista Pinardi (15 August 1880 - 2 August 1962) was an Italian Roman Catholic prelate who served as a bishop in Turin serving under three archbishops for the archdiocese. Pinardi studied for the priesthood in Chiari before his ordination in 1903 and served as a pastor until his episcopal appointment in 1916. He collaborated with Catholic Action and served as the vicar-general for the archdiocese from 1924 until Cardinal Maurilio Fossati removed him from the position in 1931 upon the advice of Pope Pius XI. His demotion enabled him to dedicate more time to his pastoral duties in the San Secondo parish church where he served from 1912 until his death. Pinardi tended to the displaced during World War II after a series of bombings in his region and was known for his anti-fascist views which contributed to his demotion from the vicar-general position.

Pinardi's beatification process started its initial steps in 1994 after the archdiocese announced its intention to launch a cause while it opened sometime later. Pinardi became titled as a Servant of God upon the cause being opened and he was later titled as Venerable in mid-2019 after Pope Francis confirmed that the late bishop lived a life of heroic virtue.

== Life ==
Giovanni Battista Pinardi was born in Castagnole Piemonte on 15 August 1880 as the last of six children (three of whom died as children) to the farmers Sebastiano and Maria Margherita (who were second cousins). Pinardi was baptized on 16 August in the San Rocco parish church and later received his Confirmation on 30 April 1888. His parents would call him "Battistino" at home.

His religious formation came from the priest Giacomo Galfione (a popular priest in the area) from Carignano and each morning would serve Mass for him or for Father Antonio Bues. He did his schooling in Carignano and upon finishing it decided that he would enter the priesthood. He commenced his ecclesial studies in Alessandria under the Salesians at their Borgo San Martino college before vesting in the cassock in 1897 and commencing his philosophical formation in Chieri until 1899 (among his professors was the future bishop Angelo Lorenzo Bartolomasi). He did mandated service in the armed forces in 1900 as part of the medical corps and following that continued with his education in Chieri before he and 51 other seminarians received their ordination to the priesthood from the Archbishop of Turin Cardinal Agostino Richelmy in the Immaculate Conception church on 29 June 1903. He finished his moral theological studies under the direction of Blessed Giuseppe Allamano and Blessed Luigi Boccardo (he obtained his doctorate on 3 July 1902) and after this from 1905 to 1912 served as the vice-pastor for the Carignano parish.

Pinardi - on 15 December 1912 - began his duties as the parish priest for the San Secondo parish in Turin and he would serve there until his death. In late 1915 the Cardinal Archbishop of Turin asked him if Pinardi would be willing to work closer with him to which Pinardi accepted. But Pinardi got up and left the room when the cardinal told him that he intended to nominate him for the episcopate which upset him. Pinardi later received a letter from Cardinal Gaetano de Lai (who headed the Sacred Consistorial Congregation) on 3 January 1916 informing him that Pope Benedict XV decided to name him a bishop. Pinardi in Turin meanwhile visited his cardinal to present to him all the reasons he was unsuited for the position while sending a letter to the pope asking for his episcopal appointment to be rescinded so he could continue his duties as a parish priest. But he received a letter from Benedict XV on 21 January who encouraged Pinardi to accept and in tears he decided to accept the appointment which was formalized on 24 January. Pinardi received his episcopal consecration in the San Secondo parish on 5 March 1916 from Bishop Costanzo Castrale and from that point would more often than not wear a simple black cassock since he eschewed the trappings of the episcopate. He also knew the priest Luigi Sturzo and held him in high esteem. Pinardi hosted Sturzo at his residence during the evening on 25 October 1924 before Sturzo was to begin his exile. He accompanied him to Porta Nuova where he bid farewell to Sturzo who would not return home until 1946. Pinardi also knew Blessed Pier Giorgio Frassati.

In his episcopate he collaborated often with the Catholic Action movement while Cardinal Giuseppe Gamba (the new Archbishop of Turin) named him as the archdiocese's vicar-general in 1924 which meant more of an administrative role in archdiocesan affairs. But after Gamba died the incoming archbishop Maurilio Fossati did not reconfirm him as vicar-general upon advice from Pope Pius XI in 1931 who advised him not to give a curial role to Pinardi to appease the fascists since Pinardi was a staunch anti-fascist. The Pope feared that giving Pinardi more curial responsibilities would antagonize the fascist regime and would seek to inflame tensions. The Italian Interior Minister Luigi Federzoni considered Pinardi to be an irritant to the regime and said that "it would be good to have him transferred" to someplace that would be less troublesome for the regime. This demotion enabled Pinardi to continue his duties as a pastor for the San Secondo parish and he tended to the poor and displaced during World War II.

In 1953 he celebrated five decades of ordination and from Pope Pius XII received an autographed letter in which the pope conferred his apostolic blessing and the honor of naming Pinardi an Assistant to the Pontifical Throme (or Monsignor). In 1960 he undertook a diocesan pilgrimage to Lourdes where he offered his life to the Blessed Mother of God.

Pinardi died on 2 August 1962 holding his crucifix near his heart. From 1964 his remains have been housed in the San Secondo church near the Sacred Heart altar according to his wishes.

== Beatification process ==
The beatification process for Pinardi had its origins to an edict that Cardinal Giovanni Saldarini issued on 26 May 1994 in which he ordered a full collection of all writings and testimonies on the life of Pinardi and his reputation for holiness. The Congregation for the Causes of Saints launched the cause on 16 April 1999 and titled him as a Servant of God after issuing the formal "nihil obstat" (no objections to the cause) decree that would enable the Turin archdiocese to begin their diocesan investigation. This local process opened a couple of months before on 30 January 1999 and was closed later on 15 December 2003. The C.C.S. later issued a decree validating the Turin investigation on 27 February 2004 and later received the official Positio dossier in 2008 for assessment.

Pinardi became titled as Venerable on 13 May 2019 after Pope Francis signed a decree that acknowledged that the late bishop had practiced heroic virtue throughout his life.
