= Boccardo =

Boccardo is a surname. Notable people with the surname include:

- Delia Boccardo (born 1948), Italian actress
- Erick Swen Pohlhammer Boccardo (1955–2023), Chilean poet
- Giorgio Boccardo (born 1982), Chilean politician
- Giovanni Maria Boccardo (1848-1913), Italian Roman Catholic priest
- James F. Boccardo (1911–2003), American trial lawyer, businessman, and philanthropist
- Jean-Pierre Boccardo (1942–2019), French sprinter
- Luigi Boccardo (1861–1936), Italian Roman Catholic priest
- Waldyr Boccardo (1936–2018), Brazilian basketball player
