= Mario Zargani =

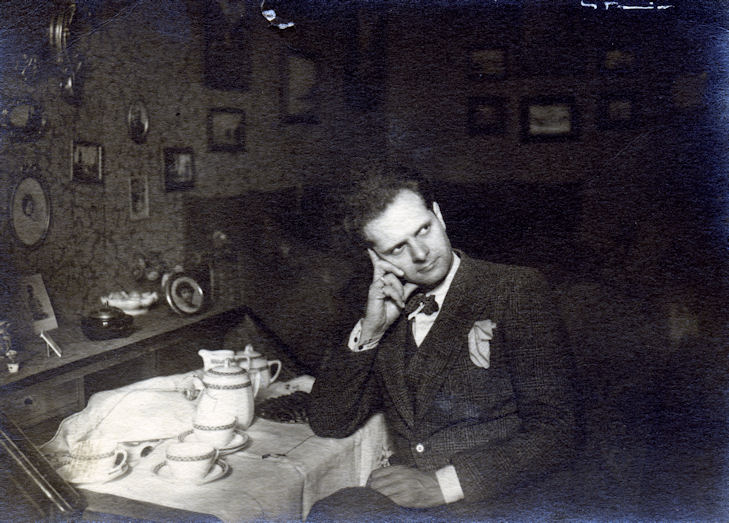
- Mario Zargani in Turin (1931)
- Born: 20 November 1895; Pisa, Italy
- Died: 4 November 1951 (aged 55)
- Occupations: musician; violist; violinist

Mario Zargani (pronounced [ˈmaːrjο dzarˈɡaːni]; 20 November 1895 – 14 November 1951) was an Italian musician, violist and violinist of Jewish origin. He was persecuted by the Fascist regime and was dismissed from the EIAR Orchestra in Turin following the enactment of the Italian racial laws.

== Biography ==
=== Childhood, musical education, and migration to Turin ===
Mario Zargani was born in Pisa on 20 November 1895 to Eugenio Zargani and Ottavia Ventura. He was a descendant of a Sephardic Jewish family that had immigrated to Italy during the mid-nineteenth century, establishing roots in the city of Livorno. On 14 May 1906, the family relocated to Turin. Raised in a culturally rich and musically inclined household, Zargani received his earliest instruction from his mother before continuing his training under a professional violinist affiliated with the Ernesto Rossi Theatre in Pisa. Demonstrating early musical aptitude, he pursued formal education at a conservatory—most likely in Parma—where he earned diplomas in both violin and viola.

On 28 September 1932, Zargani married Eugenia Tedeschi (1899–1969). The couple had two sons: Aldo (1933–2020) and Roberto (1934–2022). From a prior relationship with Silvia Piccardi, he also fathered a son, Guido (b. 1932). Between 1936 and 1937, the family resided in the outskirts of Turin, in Corso Francia near the railway. They subsequently moved to Via Berthollet in the San Salvario district, across from Valentino Park, where they remained until 21 November 1942—the day they began their flight from persecution.

=== Dismissal and anti-Jewish persecution ===
Zargani's professional life was disrupted on 8 or 9 June 1939, when he was dismissed from his position at EIAR (Ente Italiano per le Audizioni Radiofoniche), likely as a consequence of the increasingly repressive anti-Jewish policies of the Fascist regime. Despite his efforts to appeal the dismissal through trade union channels, he was only offered a temporary position as a violist in Enna. In September 1939, he traveled to Switzerland to sit for a competitive examination for a teaching post at the Basel Conservatory. Having entered Switzerland on 2 September, he sat for the examination the following day but was unsuccessful. On 10 September, he relocated with his family to Lugano in search of musical employment, but finding no viable opportunities, returned to Turin.

From June 1942, Allied bombing raids began targeting Turin. On the night of 20–21 November 1942, the city suffered heavy bombardment. The following morning, the Zargani family fled to Asti by train. In early 1943, they were joined by Rosetta Tedeschi (1891–1943), the widowed sister-in-law of Eugenia, along with her two children, Attilio and Lidia (known as Pucci, 1925–1945). Rosetta and Pucci were later deported to Auschwitz; Rosetta perished in the camp, while Pucci survived imprisonment but succumbed to dysentery shortly after liberation. Attilio survived with the help of Vittorio Valabrega, the husband of Iolanda Tedeschi, Eugenia's sister.

On 26 July 1943, Zargani sought reinstatement at EIAR, but his request was denied. A further appeal for assistance was made on 6 September in a letter to conductor Fernando Previtali. Facing increasing danger, the family fled Asti again on 30 September 1943, moving first to Costigliole d’Asti, then to Rubiana, and later to Acqui Terme. An attempt to return to Asti was aborted upon receiving warnings of imminent raids. Between October and November 1943, they passed through Cavaglià, Turin, Casale Monferrato, Borgone Susa, and finally returned to Turin.

On 20 November 1943, the family sought refuge with Antonietta, a former domestic worker who had been dismissed in 1938. She offered them shelter in her room on Via Berthollet. They remained in hiding there until 1 December 1943. In response to Minister Buffarini Guidi’s decree ordering the deportation of Jews, published in La Stampa, the family contacted the Archbishop of Turin. Cardinal Maurilio Fossati and Monsignor Vincenzo Barale arranged for Aldo and Roberto to be taken into the Salesian College in Cavaglià. The children were admitted on 2 December 1943, while their parents remained hidden in Turin.

Between late January and early February 1944, Mario and Eugenia were arrested while waiting for a tram in Via Cernaia. They were detained in Le Nuove prison but were spared deportation through the intervention of Commissioner Pandoli, Mother Superior Giuseppina Demuro (1902–1965), and Dr. Ciraldi, who certified them as unfit for forced labor. On the night of 4 March 1944, Sister Giuseppina enabled their escape.

In May 1944, with the help of Maestro Bruni, a member of the Comitato di Liberazione Nazionale (CNL), the Zarganis found refuge in the village of Uri in the Biella mountains. They received support from the Cottolengo of Bioglio and the Garibaldi Brigade under the leadership of Cino Moscatelli. The Municipality of Bioglio issued them false identity documents. Meanwhile, Aldo and Roberto remained at the Salesian boarding school under the protection of Monsignor Vittorio Cavasin. However, an SS raid on the institution in early October 1944 and a proposal for Aldo to enter the seminary prompted the parents to retrieve their children, who arrived in Uri on 15 October 1944.

The family spent the final months of the war living in a remote mountain hut on the slopes of Monte Rovella. Zargani supported his family by working as a barber and giving music lessons, while maintaining discreet ties with local partisan groups. He and his son narrowly escaped two raids, one in January and another in March 1945. On 25 April, wary that the conflict might not yet be over, Zargani insisted that his children remain in hiding. They finally reached Bioglio on 30 April 1945.

=== Postwar resettlement and professional reinstatement ===
On 7 May 1945, the Zargani family returned to Turin, gradually resuming their daily routines amidst an atmosphere of cautious normality. They personally thanked Commissioner Pandoli and Sister Giuseppina for their crucial role in preventing their deportation. Later that year, Mario Zargani was reinstated by RAI in Turin as second viola, alternating in the position of principal viola, and resumed his professional activities as a concert musician. He continued to perform with the orchestra of the Teatro Regio. Mario Zargani died in Turin on 4 November 1951.

== Bibliography ==
- Zargani, Aldo (2010) Per violino solo. La mia infanzia nell'aldiquà (1938–1945) (Bologna: Il Mulino. 2010) ISBN 978-88-151-3411-0
- Giuseppe Fagnocchi (ed.) (2025) Primo incontro del Dottorato di ricerca Musica perseguitata e Patrimoni musicali. XL ciclo a.a. 2024–2025 Conservatorio di Rovigo (Rovigo: Conservatorio. 2025)ISBN 979-12-210-9525-8
