= Pinardi =

Pinardi is an Italian surname. Notable people with the surname include:

- Alex Pinardi (born 1980), Italian footballer
- Giovanni Battista Pinardi (1880–1962), Italian Roman Catholic prelate
- Nadia Pinardi (born 1956), Italian oceanographer and academic
- Umberto Pinardi (1928–2025), Italian footballer and manager
