= Stria House =

- Casa degli Stria
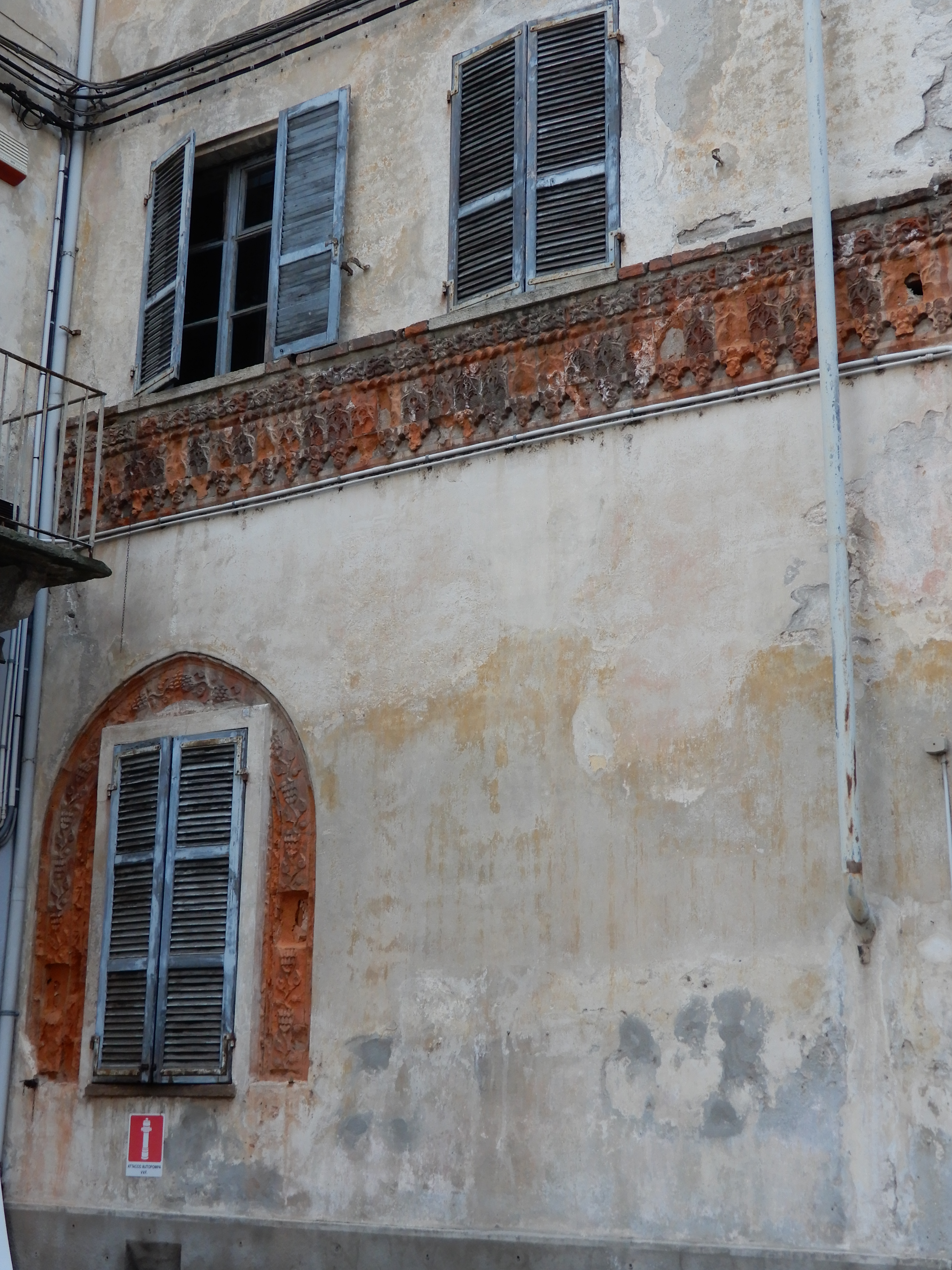
- The Stria House in 2020
- Click on the map for a fullscreen view

General information
- Location: Ivrea, Italy
- Coordinates: 45°27′57.46″N 7°52′35.2″E

The Stria House (Italian: Casa degli Stria) is a historic building located in Ivrea, Italy.

== History ==
The house belonged to the prominent Stria noble family from Ivrea. Here, in 1391, Amadeus VII of Savoy signed an agreement with the Canavese nobility and representatives of the Tuchini, which brought an end to the Tuchinaggio uprising.

In 1884, the decorations of the façades were reproduced by Alfredo d'Andrade in the Borgo Medioevale in Turin.

== Description ==
The building is located along Via Siccardi in the historic centre of Ivrea. The façade preserves a decorative terracotta cornice featuring trefoil arches, foliage, and an intertwined rope motif, a testament to a medieval noble residence.

== Gallery ==
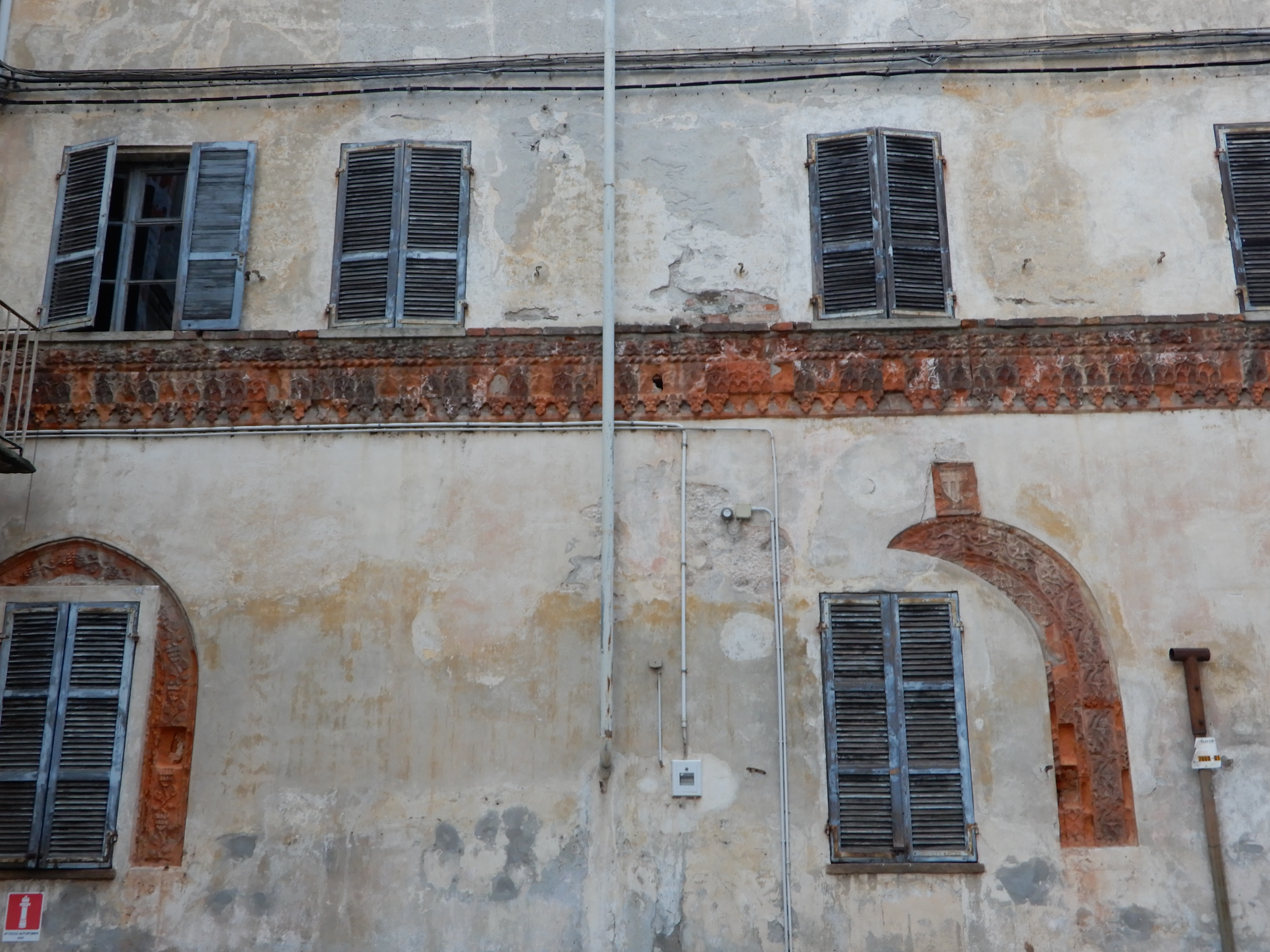

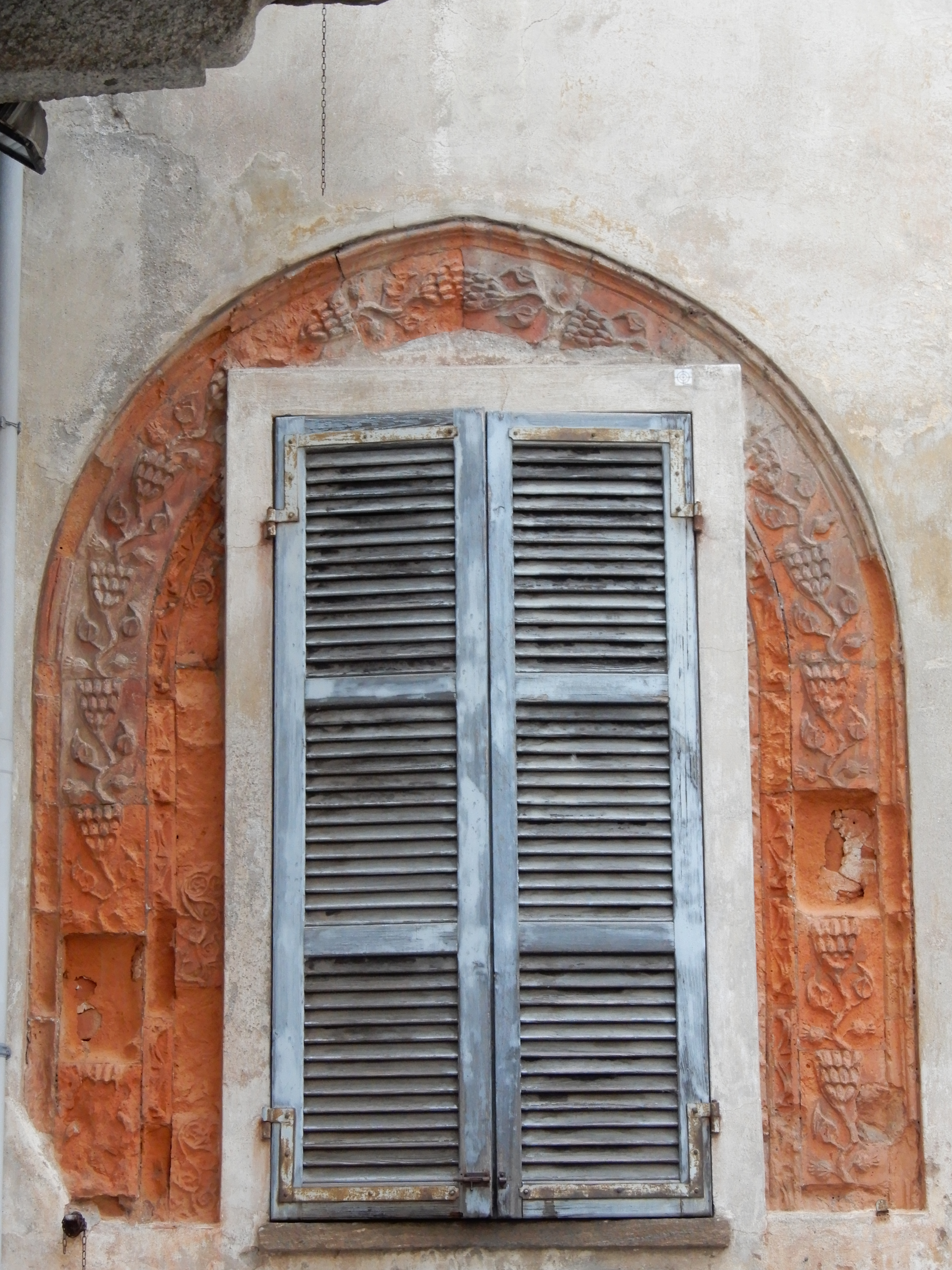

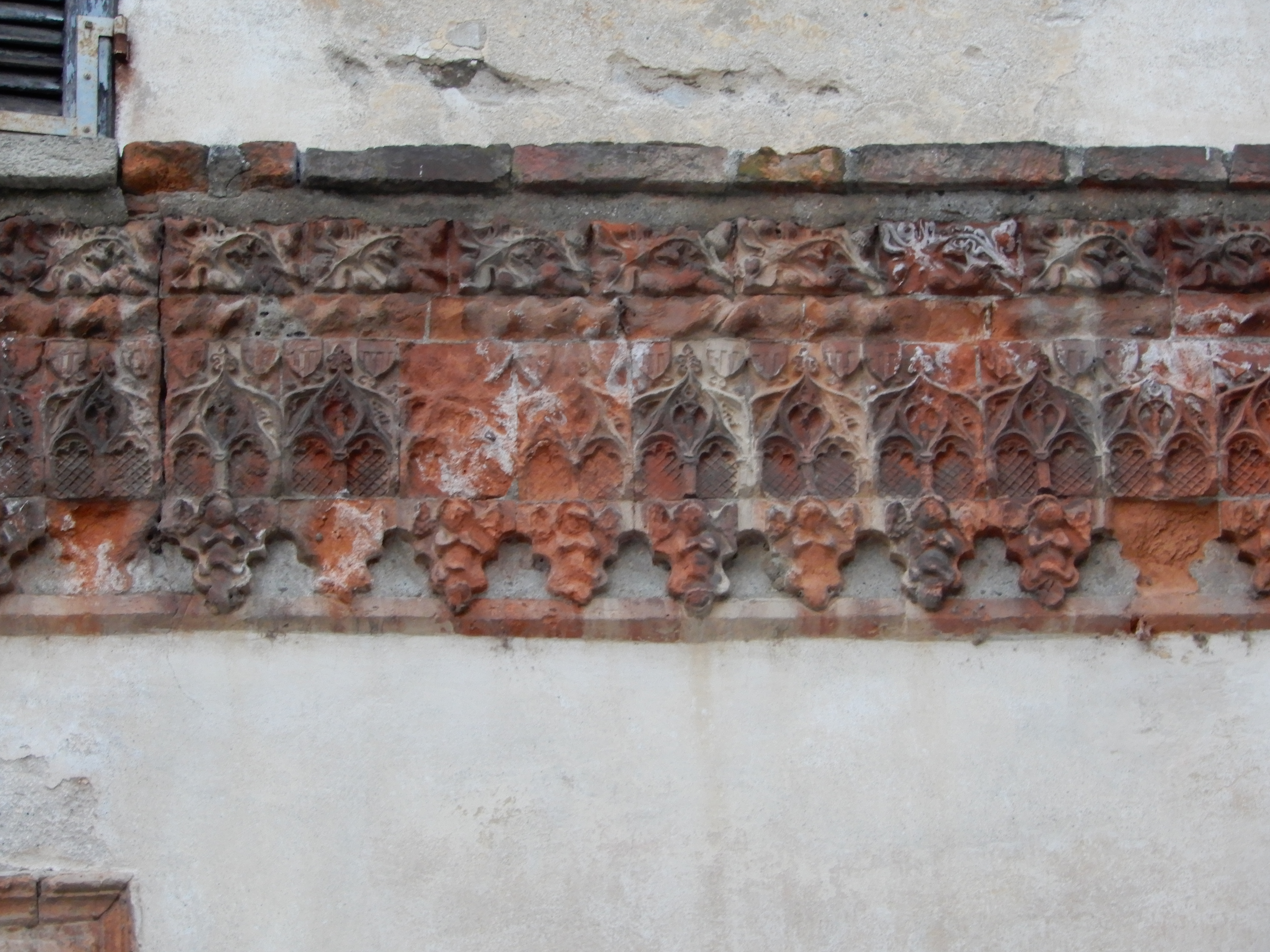
