= Aldo Zargani =

Italian writer (1933–2020)

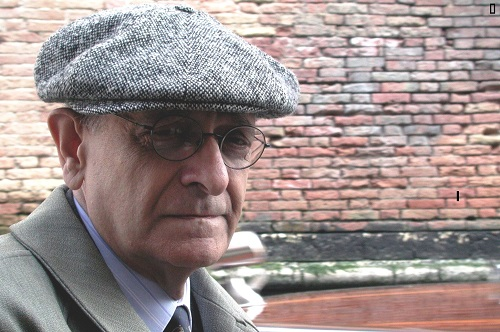
Aldo Zargani

Aldo Zargani (7 August 1933 – 18 October 2020) was an Italian Jewish writer and public intellectual who lived in Rome. He started writing in his early sixties: his first and best-known book, Per violino solo (For Solo Violin), appeared in 1995. In addition to his autobiographical writing, Zargani contributed to discussions about the politics and culture of Italian Jews with essays, lectures, and school visits.

== Biography ==
Aldo Zargani was born in Turin in 1933 to Mario Zargani and Eugenia Tedeschi. In the second half of 1938, when he was five years old, the Fascist regime passed a series of anti-Semitic laws which affected the lives of every one of the approximately 46,000 Jews who lived in Italy at the time. Jews were prohibited from studying or teaching in state and private schools, forbidden to marry non-Jews, expelled from the Fascist Party and excluded from the public administration, from telephone directories and from obituary columns. Zargani's father Mario, a viola player in the national radio orchestra, was dismissed from his job, and Aldo and his brother started attending an ad hoc school set up by the Turin Jewish community.

After Northern and Central Italy were occupied by German troops following the armistice between Italy and the Allies on 8 September 1943, the SS and the Gestapo began to round up Jews in every community. Zargani's parents were arrested but were able to avoid deportation, unlike some other members of their families. Aldo and his brother spent a year in hiding in a Catholic boarding school.

After World War II had ended, Zargani continued to live in Turin and worked as an actor in two theatre companies; he met his wife, Elena Magoja, a theatre and film actress, at this time. His principal employer was the Italian state radio and television corporation RAI, first in Turin and then in Rome. He retired in 1994. He had a daughter, Lina, and a grandson, Mario, for whom he wrote Per violino solo.

Zargani's political allegiance was with the Italian Left. He was a long-time member of a left-wing faction of the Italian Socialist Party and was an active member of the Gruppo Martin Buber – Ebrei per la pace (Jews for Peace) which recognizes the right of the Israeli and Palestinian peoples to independent and sovereign national states. Most of his essays focus on relations between Jews and non-Jews in Italy or political and historical uses of Holocaust memory.

== Works ==
- Per violino solo. La mia infanzia nell'Aldiqua. 1938–1945, Bologna, Il Mulino, 1995 (reprinted in 2003 with a new preface by the author).
- Certe promesse d'amore. Bologna, Il Mulino,1997.
- L'Odeur du lac [The Scent of the Lake] (three stories not yet published in Italian; French translation and foreword by Olivier Favier, Alidades, Évian, 2008).
- In bilico (noi gli ebrei e anche gli altri). Venice, Marsilio, 2017.
- Numerous articles and essays published in various journals: Il Mulino, Lettera internazionale, Doppiozero as well as in Ha Keillah, the journal of the Turin Jewish community.

Per violino solo has been translated into German (Für Violine solo. Meine Kindheit im Diesseits 1938–1945, 1998), English (For Solo Violin. A Jewish Childhood in Fascist Italy, 2002), Spanish (Cielos de Espanto, 2002) and French (Pour violon seul. Souvenirs d'enfance dans l'En-deca 1938–1945, 2007). It has won three Italian awards (Ischia International Journalism Award, Premio Acqui Storia, Premio Sant'Anna di Stazzema) and was shortlisted for four prestigious literary prizes (Premio Viareggio, Premio Pisa, Premio Lucca and Pen Club Award).

Per violino solo and Certe promesse d'amore (Some Promises of Love) are autobiographical texts. The former traces the narrated self's childhood between 1938 and 1945, against the background of war, civil war, and the Shoah. In the latter the narrated self, a teenager, is drawn to Marxism and left-wing Zionism, discovers love, and gradually sheds a number of personal and political illusions. In both texts the narratives are arranged in a loose chronological sequence, but within each chapter there are numerous flashbacks and "flashforwards" triggered by associations. The memory of the elderly narrating self intersects with the perspectives of the child and adolescent narrated selves, correcting and evaluating them with help of hindsight.

In bilico is a collection of twenty autobiographical narratives and vignettes, set at various times in Zargani's life, where he touches on the contradictions and multiple nature of Jewish history and identity.

In all of Zargani's narratives humour and irony play a central role. Their function is both intellectual and ethical. They highlight the tension between Jews as "insiders" and Jews as "outsiders", emphasize personal, cultural and political contradictions, and problematize monolithic notions of "identity". "Over time," he states in the concluding pages of Per violino solo, "it seems that only humor and religion survive, while memories fade with the life of the person who carried them."
