= Ruggero Cipolla =

Italian Roman Catholic priest (1911-2006)

Padre Ruggero Cipolla OFM

Personal life
- Born: December 2, 1911 Turin, Italy
- Died: December 1, 2006 (aged 94) Turin, Italy

Religious life
- Religion: Roman Catholic
- Order: Francescani (en-Franciscans)

Ruggero Cipolla (1911–2006) was an Italian Roman Catholic priest who aided and corroborated Sister Giuseppina De Muro when she worked during the German occupation of Italy to save over 500 people from Nazi concentration camps.

== Career ==
Father Cipolla was a member of the Franciscan religious congregation, and the chaplain for the prison "Le Nuove" where Sister De Muro also worked. He personally spiritually accompanied at least 72 prisoners who had been sentenced to death. The museum in Turin notes that "Durante l'occupazione tedesca si adoperò per sorreggere spiritualmente i detenuti confortandoli, aiutandoli con i mezzi possibili, utilizzando il saio per introdurre medicine, indumenti, piccole quantità di cibo, facendo da tramite nelle comunicazioni con le loro famiglie. Taluni erano in transito, in attesa della deportazione, altri, detenuti politici, condannati a morte dal tribunale straordinario." ("During the German occupation he worked to spiritually support the prisoners by comforting them, helping them with the means possible, using the habit to bring in medicines, clothes, small quantities of food, acting as an intermediary in communications with their families. Some were in transit, awaiting deportation, others, political prisoners, sentenced to death by the extraordinary tribunal.")

After Sister De Muro wrote a report for Cardinal Archbishop Maurilio Fossati, who had urged Catholics to take Jewish refugees into their homes, describing the horrors and the suffering, Fr. Cipolla wrote to him as well, asserting that everything she said was true.
