= Giovanni Maria Boccardo =

Italian Roman Catholic priest

Blessed Giovanni Maria Boccardo

Priest
- Born: 20 November 1848; Moncalieri, Turin, Kingdom of Sardinia
- Died: 30 December 1913 (aged 65); Moncalieri, Turin, Kingdom of Italy
- Venerated in: Roman Catholic Church
- Beatified: 24 May 1998, Turin, Italy by Pope John Paul II
- Feast: 30 December
- Attributes: Priest's cassock; Stole
- Patronage: Poor Daughters of Saint Cajetan; Against cancer

Giovanni Maria Boccardo (20 November 1848 - 30 December 1913) was an Italian Roman Catholic priest and the founder of the Poor Daughters of Saint Cajetan. Boccardo tended to victims of a cholera epidemic in 1884 and was forced to resign all positions in his parish in 1911 due to illness that confined him to his bed. He was the elder brother of Blessed Luigi Boccardo.

He was beatified in 1998 on the occasion of the pastoral visit of Pope John Paul II to Turin.

== Life ==
Giovanni Maria Boccardo was born on 20 November 1848 in Turin as the eldest of ten children born to Gaspare Boccardo and Giuseppina Malebra; he was baptized on 21 November. Three brothers - including Luigi Boccardo - became priests and another three died as infants. His siblings included his sister Giacinta and brothers Albino and Giovanni Ottavio.

Boccardo was generous to the plight of the poor as a child and adolescent and on one occasion cared for a blind beggar. He studied with the Barnabites in 1861 and graduated from their school in 1864; he commenced his studies for the priesthood the following 8 September.

Monsignor Balma ordained Boccardo to the priesthood on 3 June 1871. He desired the religious life but was instead assigned to teaching in Turin while he became the spiritual director of Chieri seminarians in 1873; he also served in that same position in Turin. During this time he befriended John Bosco as well as Leonardo Murialdo and Giuseppe Allamano. He received a doctorate in his theological studies on 1 February 1877.

Boccardo was named as a canon of the Church of Santa Maria della Scala in Chieri and in 1882 was made the pastor of Moncalieri - he would remain there until his death. He devoted himself to proper parish catechism and made it an objective to visit the prisons of Saluzzo to provide spiritual comfort to prisoners. His private writings on spiritual matters runs to a total of 44 volumes. He was present for his brother Luigi's first Mass as a priest on 8 June 1884.

In 1884 a cholera epidemic struck Moncalieri and Boccardo worked with the ill while opening a hospice for victims on 6 November 1884 in which the first victims began flooding in for his assistance. He founded the Poor Daughters of Saint Cajetan on 21 November 1884. The Maria Carlotta Fontana (1870-1935) joined the order on 7 December 1886. In 1911 he was forced to quit all positions he held due to being paralyzed.

Boccardo died on 30 December 1913; his funeral was celebrated on 1 January 1914. His remains were re-interred in 1924 to the motherhouse of the congregation - his brother Luigi oversaw the exhumation. The order received the diocesan approval of the Archbishop of Turin Agostino Richelmy and received the decree of praise from Pope Pius XII on 29 April 1948 while granting formal approval on 19 April 1958.

As of 2005 there were 132 religious in a total of 20 houses in nations such as Argentina and Togo.

== Beatification ==
The beatification process commenced in 1960 - under Pope John XXIII - in an informative process that accorded the title of Servant of God upon him as the first official stage in the process. Upon its closure the Congregation for the Causes of Saints validated the process on 1 November 1989 while the Positio was submitted to the C.C.S. in 1991 for their assessment.

Boccardo was proclaimed to be Venerable on 6 April 1998 after Pope John Paul II declared that he had lived a life of heroic virtue. The pontiff approved a miracle attributed to him a month later and beatified him in 1998 during his apostolic visit to Turin.

The miracle in question was the 1968 cure of Lina Alvez de Oliveira from São Paulo in Brazil.

The current postulator assigned to the cause is Sister Livia Piccinali.
