= Guido Chiarelli =

Italian electrical engineer

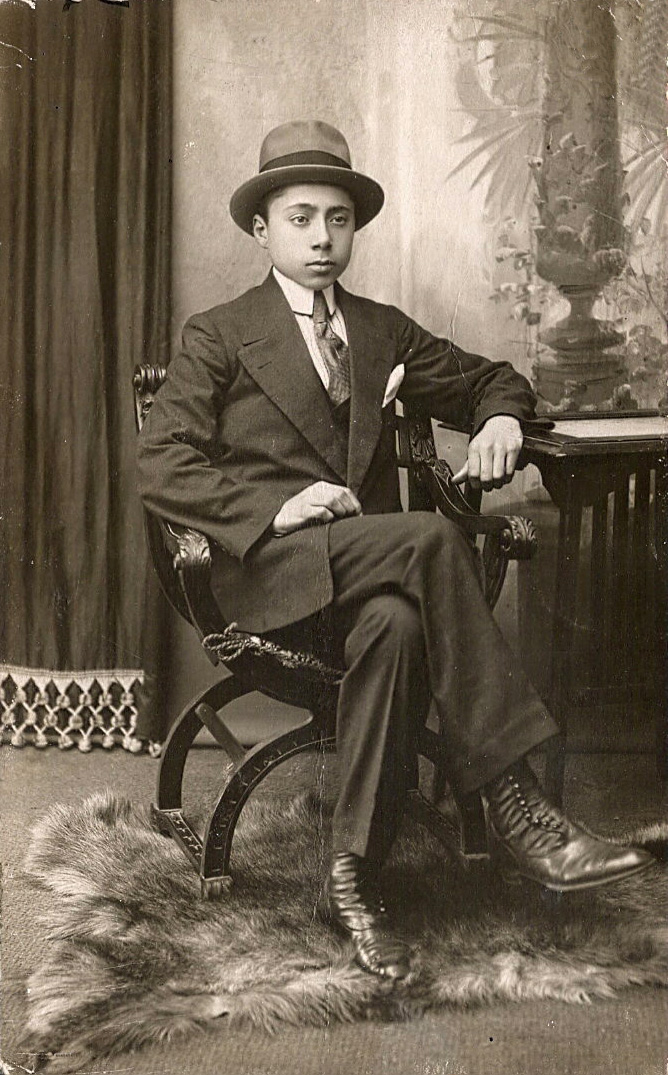
- Guido Chiarelli as a student at the University of Palermo, 1922
- Born: 24 September 1902; Caltanissetta
- Died: 7 October 1982 (aged 80); Turin
- Education: Polytechnic University of Turin
- Scientific career
- Fields: Public street and highway lighting Traffic Lights; Pipeline transport Heating systems Street clocks
- Workplaces: City Hall, Turin

Guido Chiarelli (24 September 1902 – 7 October 1982) was an Italian electrical engineer. He is known for his pioneering work in public lighting.

== Biography ==
Guido Chiarelli was born on 24 September 1902 in Caltanissetta. He spent his childhood there and studied at the Technical Institute. He was the eldest in a family of four children and his father encouraged him to become a mining engineer. He began his studies at the University of Palermo, and finished them at the Polytechnic University of Turin, after attending a course in electrical engineering. From 1928 to 1968 he worked at the City Hall of Turin, where he was able to put into practice the lessons learnt in his engineering courses: he was appointed chief engineer in 1956. Guido Chiarelli died in Turin on 7 October 1982 at the age of 80.

== Career ==
During his career he worked in different fields, designing and building electrical wiring, heating systems, pipeline transport, street clocks, and traffic lights. In the 1950s he also designed a luminous signage column to be positioned at tramway stops. His name, however, is mainly linked to public street and highway lighting for the changes he made. In the early 1960s Guido Chiarelli's plans for lighting Turin were groundbreaking and elevated municipal lighting to an appreciated form of design leading to city becoming known as the Italian "Ville Lumière". In 1961 for the celebrations of the centenary of the Italian unification, he particularly designed and installed several, innovative lighting systems. With Guido Chiarelli's modern applications and creations, for the first time public lighting had also an artistic impact which could be seen in the lighting of the fountains and of the rock garden at Parco del Valentino, created for Expo 61 which attracted over 4 million visitors. In 1961, he also realized the project for the lighting of the Mole Antonelliana, at the end of the work for the reconstruction of the spire. In 1958 he obtained the title of Knight and in 1965 the title of Officer of the Order of Merit of the Italian Republic. In 2011, for the celebrations of the 150th anniversary of the Italian unification, his work was commemorated in Turin three times: in June with posters in Palazzo Carignano square, on 8 July at the Lingotto Gallery and during the celebration on 24 July at the Officine Grandi Riparazioni. On June 9, 2012, in Agliè, on the occasion of the awards of "Il Meleto di Guido Gozzano" literary competition, with the poetry reading of An Evening Sky, Guido Chiarelli was honoured for his street lighting works.

On July 3, 2019, at the presence of the City Hall authorities, a commemorative plaque for Guido Chiarelli was unveiled in Valentino Park.

On January 4, 2021 Guido Chiarelli's daughter Lidia attended the unveiling of the new plaque at the entrance of the Rock Garden at Valentino Park.

On the occasion of the 120th anniversary of his birth, a major exhibition entitled Lights for the City was organized in the courtly salons of the Villa Amoretti in Turin, involving some seventy artists. (October 25-November 5 2022).

A commemorative plaque was unveiled in Caltanissetta on Dec. 28, 2023, in the presence of Prof. Enzo Falzone, historian and scholar of the city, and city authorities in particular Councillors Cettina Andaloro and Marcello Frangiamone. At the request of Marco D'Arma, President of the Providence district, the plaque was placed at 27 Narese Street, where Guido Chiarelli had lived until 1922.

== Publications ==
- (in Italian) Il trattamento delle spazzature, "Torino" rivista mensile municipale, n. 7, 1931
- (in Italian) L'illuminazione pubblica di Torino, "Torino" rivista mensile municipale, n. 6, 1933
- (in Italian) La centrale telefonica automatica municipale, "Torino" rivista mensile municipale, n. 11, 1933
- (in Italian) La segnalazione automatica degli incendi, "Torino" rivista mensile municipale, n. 11, 1934
- (in Italian) Le piastre riflettenti per la segnalazione stradale notturna a riflessione, "L'Industria", n. 5, 1935
- (in Italian) Trazione elettrica ferroviaria per il nuovo mercato ortofrutticolo, "Torino" rivista mensile municipale, n. 12, 1935
- (in Italian) Vivide luci sulla città, "Torino" rivista mensile municipale, n. 2, 1936
- (in Italian) Illuminazione moderna, "Torino" rivista mensile municipale, n. 2, 1938, p. 55
- (in Italian) Torino sotto la luce blu, "Il Fiduciario", luglio-settembre 1939.
- Il trattamento delle spazzature, "Rivista dell'Istituto Nazionale di Urbanistica", n. 2, 1939
- (in Italian) L'oscuramento delle luci in caso di guerra, "Torino" rivista mensile municipale, n. 1, 1939
- (in Italian) Luci delle città, "Illustrazione d'Italia ", 6 ottobre 1946
- (in Italian) Come si fabbrica il gas, "Torino" rivista mensile municipale, n. 2, 1949
- (in Italian) Il consumo dell'energia elettrica a Torino nell'ultimo venticinquennio, "Torino" rivista mensile municipale, n. 7, 1951

== Bibliography ==
- (in Italian) AIDI (Associazione Italiana d'Illuminazione), Aspetti dell'illuminazione pubblica di Torino, atti del 1º Convegno Nazionale AIDI (Torino, 11-13 mai 1961), Turin, Ilte, 1961.
- (in Italian) Chiara Aghemo, Luigi Bistagnino, Chiara Ronchetta, Illuminare la città. Sviluppo dell'illuminazione pubblica a Torino, Turin, Celid, 1994.
- (in Italian) Alessandro Guido Actis, Marco Bodo, Mario Broglino, Torino di Luce, Pinerolo, Alzani, 2006.
- (in Italian) Storia dell'illuminazione pubblica a Torino in storiaindustria.it
- (in Italian) Mario Broglino, Lidia Chiarelli, Enzo Papa, Torino: Percorsi di luce, Rotary Club Torino Crocetta - Distretto Rotary 2030, 2011.
- (in Italian) Piano della luce decorativa - Relazione Illustrativa, Città di Torino - Iride Servizi, October, 2011.
- (in Italian) Paolo Silvetti, Torino Città Illuminata (Alla scoperta dei suoi lampioni storici), Torino, Daniela Piazza Editore, 2021
- (in Italian) Nico Ivaldi, Italia 61 L'evento che cambiò Torino, Sant'Ambrogio (Torino), Susalibri, 2021
- (in Italian) Milo Julini, Torino Luoghi e Personaggi, Castellamonte (Torino), Editrice Tipografia Baima-Ronchetti & C, 2023
