= Luigi Boccardo =

Blessed Luigi Boccardo

Priest
- Born: 9 August 1861; Moncalieri, Turin, Kingdom of Italy
- Died: 9 June 1936 (aged 74); Turin, Kingdom of Italy
- Venerated in: Roman Catholic Church
- Beatified: 14 April 2007, Church of the Holy Face, Turin, Italy by Cardinal José Saraiva Martins
- Feast: 9 June
- Attributes: Stole; Cassock
- Patronage: Sisters of Jesus the King

Luigi Boccardo (9 August 1861 - 9 June 1936) was an Italian Roman Catholic priest and the brother of Giovanni Maria Boccardo. Luigi established the Sisters of Jesus the King as a contemplative branch to his latter brother's Poor Daughters of Saint Cajetan.

Boccardo served as a simple parish priest in Turin and was noted for his commitment to religious vocations as well as for his devotion to methods of evangelization for the faithful under his charge. He has been nicknamed the "Apostle of Merciful Love".

His beatification cause commenced after his death and - upon the approval of Pope Benedict XVI - was beatified on 14 April 2007; Cardinal José Saraiva Martins presided over it on the behalf of the pope in Turin.

== Life ==
Luigi Boccardo was born on 9 August 1861 as the seventh of nine children to Gaspare Boccardo and Giuseppina Malerba; his siblings included his sister Giacinta and his brothers Albino and Giovanni Ottavio. His eldest brother was Giovanni Maria (20 November 1848 - 30 December 1913).

Giovanni Ottavio - at the age of thirteen - became Luigi's godfather at the latter's baptism and would have a decisive role in Luigi's future.

His parents - though farmers - managed to enroll their son in an education with the Barnabite Fathers where older brother Giovanni Ottavio also studied. The latter's good example served to have a great impact on Boccardo who began to think that he might want to become a priest and received additional confidence in that path when his sister Giacinta entered - in 1874 - a cloistered convent.

Boccardo's parents expressed their reluctance at allowing Luigi to become a priest but his older brother Giovanni Ottavio interceded to their parents on his behalf. He also took the financial burden of providing for his ecclesiastical studies. Boccardo commenced his studies in October 1875 and received the clerical cassock on 23 September 1877. It was around this time he contracted a severe illness in the form of an aggressive fever that almost killed him; a last resort to save him was water for him to drink from Lourdes. It was this water that helped him deepen and cultivate further a devotion to the Blessed Virgin and on a card wrote: "This is she who saved me and stole my heart".

During this period Boccardo also received the spiritual direction from Giuseppe Allamano. He was ordained to the priesthood on 7 June 1884 and received ordination from the Cardinal Archbishop of Turin Gaetano Alimonda. He celebrated his first Mass in the presence of his parents and siblings as well as the faithful on 8 June. Boccardo was appointed as a parochial vicar in the parish where his brother Giovanni Maria served as a parish priest at Pancalieri. He supported the latter when he founded the Sisters of Saint Cajetan. On 12 April 1886 he was appointed as the Vice-Rector and the spiritual director of priests at the Ecclesiastical Boarding School of Our Lady of Good Counsel in Turin and served for three decades with Allamano who was the rector.

He was made an Honorary Canon of the Collegiate of Ss. Trinity on 2 June 1909. In 1913 he published his first ascetic work entitled "The Spiritual Son" as part of his major work: "Confession and Management". He also published "The Spiritual Father" and "The Celestial Vocations" between 1913 and 1928. Boccardo's brother Giovanni Maria died on 30 December 1913; Boccardo later oversaw in 1924 the exhumation of his late brother. On 9 January 1914 - at the behest of Cardinal Agostino Richelmy - he was made the Superior General of his late brother's order. Boccardo also underwent pilgrimages to both Lourdes and Rome and also travelled south to Naples and then up north to both Lucca and Florence.

On 3 December 1919 he was made the director of the Institute for the Blind which was at the time in grave debt. He took residence with that institute on 12 June 1928. On 24 October 1931 he finished work and consecrated the new Shrine of Christ the King.

Boccardo - on 18 January 1932 - decided to establish his own religious congregation as a contemplative branch of his late brother's order and named it the Sisters of Jesus the King. The first vesting of its first members was held on 19 October 1932.

He presided over his final Mass on 26 April 1936 and died in peace on 9 June 1936. His remains were moved from its first resting place on 15 November 1937 and were moved again on 8 June 1961.

== Beatification ==
The process for beatification commenced on 19 April 1979 - under Pope John Paul II - in a diocesan process in Turin that would gather documents on his life as well as collate all his writings and information on his congregation. The beginning of the process granted him the title Servant of God.

The process later closed and received the validation of the Congregation for the Causes of Saints on 7 February 1992; this allowed for the latter to commence their own investigation on Boccardo's life and works and began the so-called "Roman Phase". This allowed for the postulation to compile the Positio - or dossier containing biographical details as well as attesting his virtues - and submit it to officials in Rome in 1995. However it was forced to pass the approval of a historical commission who had to ensure all was in order before the cause could proceed.

On 12 April 2003 he was proclaimed to be Venerable after John Paul II acknowledged the fact that Boccardo had lived a model Christian life of heroic virtue - both the cardinal and theological virtues.

The miracle needed for his beatification was investigated and received validation as being a process that fulfilled its duties on 2 December 1994. A decade later it moved to a medical board based in Rome who approved it on 11 March 2004; consulting theologians also approved it on 19 October 2004 and the Congregation for the Causes of Saints followed suit on 15 March 2005.

The healing was approved as a legitimate miracle on 15 December 2005; Cardinal José Saraiva Martins presided over the beatification on 14 April 2007 on the behalf of Pope Benedict XVI.

The current postulator assigned to the cause is Sister Livia Piccinali.
