= Giuseppe Gamba =

Italian Cardinal

His Eminence Giuseppe Gamba
- Cardinal, Archbishop of Turin
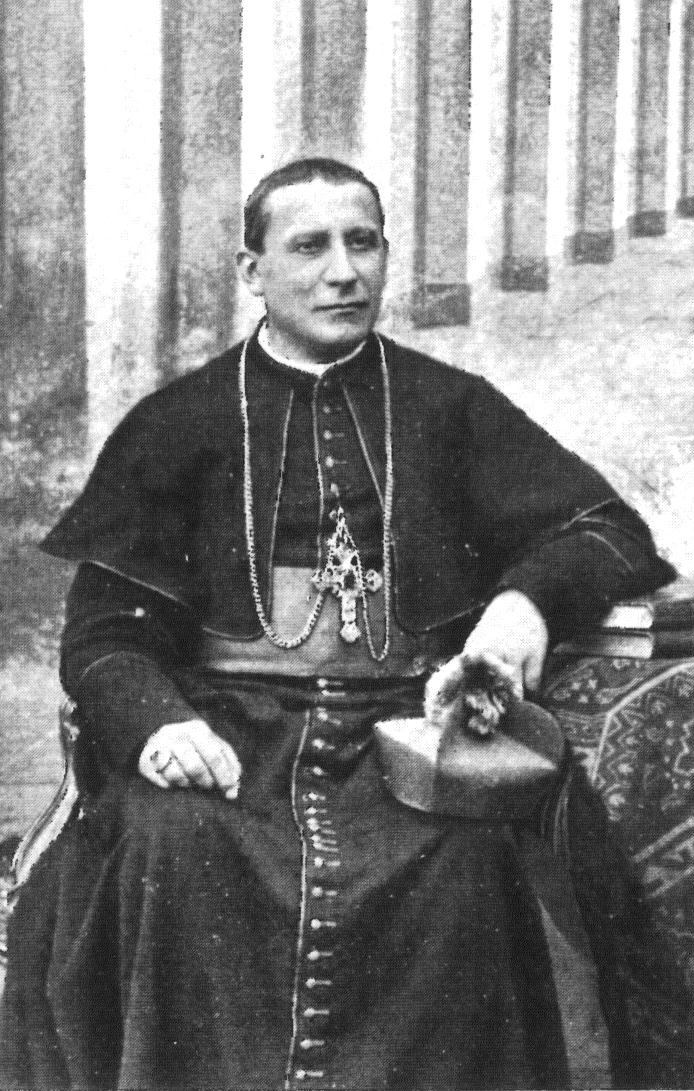
- Church: Roman Catholic Church
- Archdiocese: Turin
- See: Turin
- Appointed: 20 December 1923
- Term ended: 26 December 1929
- Predecessor: Agostino Richelmy
- Successor: Maurilio Fossati
- Other post: Cardinal-Priest of Santa Maria sopra Minerva (1926-29)
- Previous posts: Bishop of Biella (1901-06); Bishop of Novara (1906-23)

Orders
- Ordination: 18 September 1880 by Carlo Savio
- Consecration: 23 February 1902 by Giacinto Arcangeli
- Created cardinal: 20 December 1926 by Pope Pius XI
- Rank: Cardinal-Priest

Personal details
- Born: Giuseppe Gamba; 25 April 1857 San Damiano d'Asti, Asti, Kingdom of Piedmont-Sardinia
- Died: 26 December 1929 (aged 72) Turin, Kingdom of Italy
- Education: Pontifical Roman Athenaeum S. Apollinare
- Motto: Dirige in conspectus tuo viam meam
- Coat of arms

Styles of Giuseppe Gamba
- Reference style: His Eminence
- Spoken style: Your Eminence
- Informal style: Cardinal
- See: Turin

Giuseppe Gamba (25 April 1857 – 26 December 1929) was an Italian Cardinal of the Roman Catholic Church and an archbishop of Turin.

== Biography ==
=== Early life and ministry ===
Giuseppe Gamba was born in Asti, Italy and was educated at the local Seminary of Asti. He was ordained on 18 September 1880 and did pastoral work and served as the vicar general of the diocese of Asti from 1883 until 1901.

=== Episcopate ===
He was appointed Bishop of Biella on 16 December 1901 by Pope Leo XIII. He was transferred to the see of Novara on 13 August 1906, where he remained until he was promoted to the metropolitan see of Turin on 20 December 1923.

=== Cardinalate ===
He was created Cardinal-Priest of Santa Maria sopra Minerva by Pope Pius XI in the consistory of 20 December 1926. He died in 1929 after being a cardinal for only three years.

== Sources ==
- Angrisani, Giuseppe. Il cardinale Giuseppe Gamba. (in Italian). Torino-Roma: Marietti 1930. [eulogistic]
- Bräuer, Martin (2014). Handbuch der Kardinäle: 1846-2012 (in German). Berlin: De Gruyter. p. 1910. ISBN 978-3-11-026947-5.

Catholic Church titles
Preceded by Agostino Richelmy	Archbishop of Turin; 20 December 1923–26 December 1929	Succeeded by Maurilio Fossati
