= Borgo Medioevale =

Coordinates: 45.049°N 7.68511°E

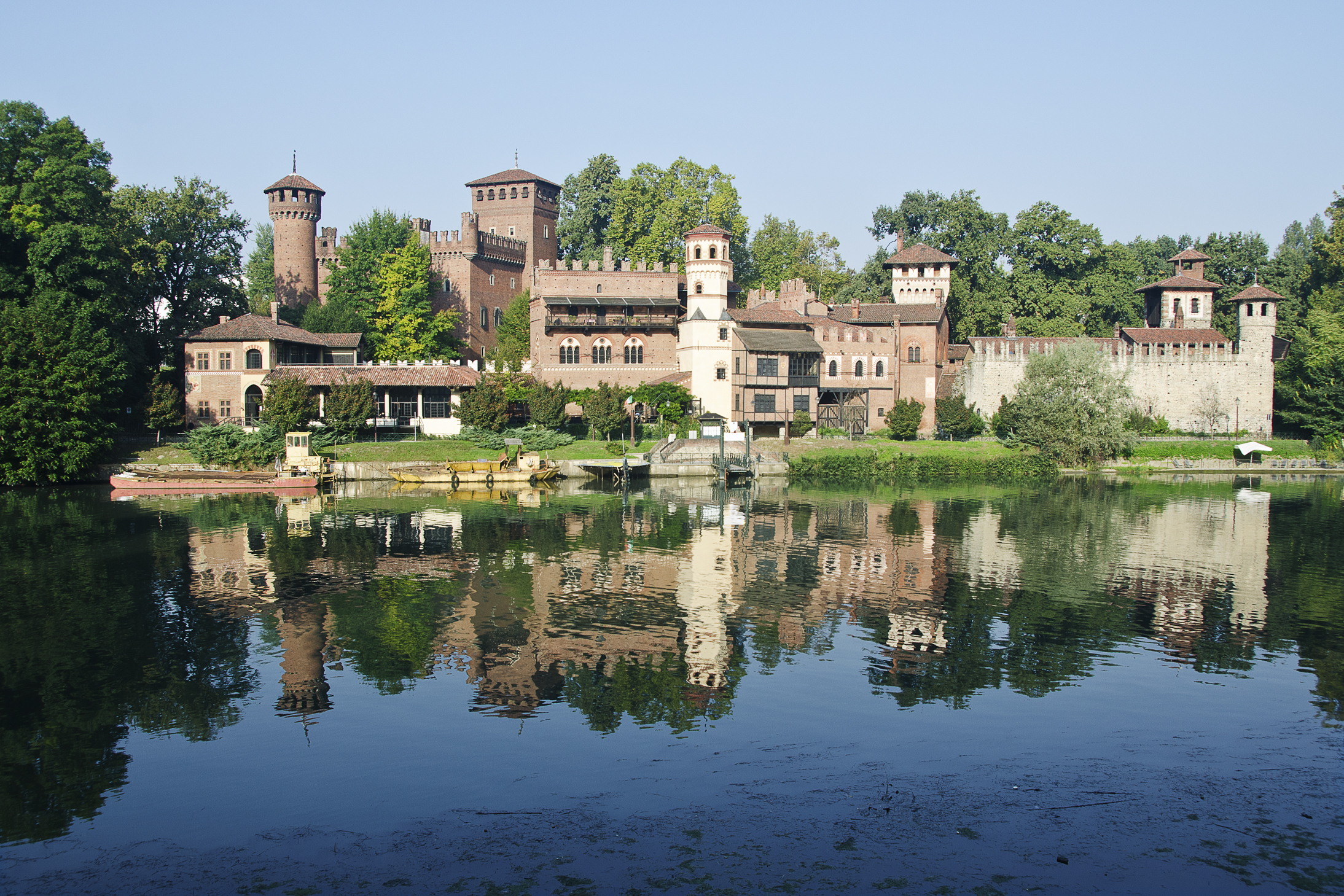
- View of the Borgo Medievale in Turin, located along the Po River.
- Established: 1884
- Location: Parco del Valentino
- Type: Open air museum
- Visitors: 145,000 (2016)
- Website: borgomedievaletorino.it

The Borgo Medioevale ('Medieval Village') is an open air museum and reconstructed medieval village and castle in Turin, Italy. It is located in the Parco del Valentino (Valentino Park) on the riverbank of the Po river. It was built for the 1884 Italian general exposition and it was constructed by replicating and mimicking late-medieval architecture of the Piedmont region.

The reconstructed architecture, decorations, and landscaping followed strict criteria of faithfulness to historical models. Over 40 sites (including castles, villages, and churches) all across Piedmont and Aosta Valley were used as models and many intellectuals, historians, artists and technicians took part in the project. Among the structures that served as models are Fénis Castle, Issogne Castle, Verrès Castle, and Ivrea Castle.

== Gallery ==
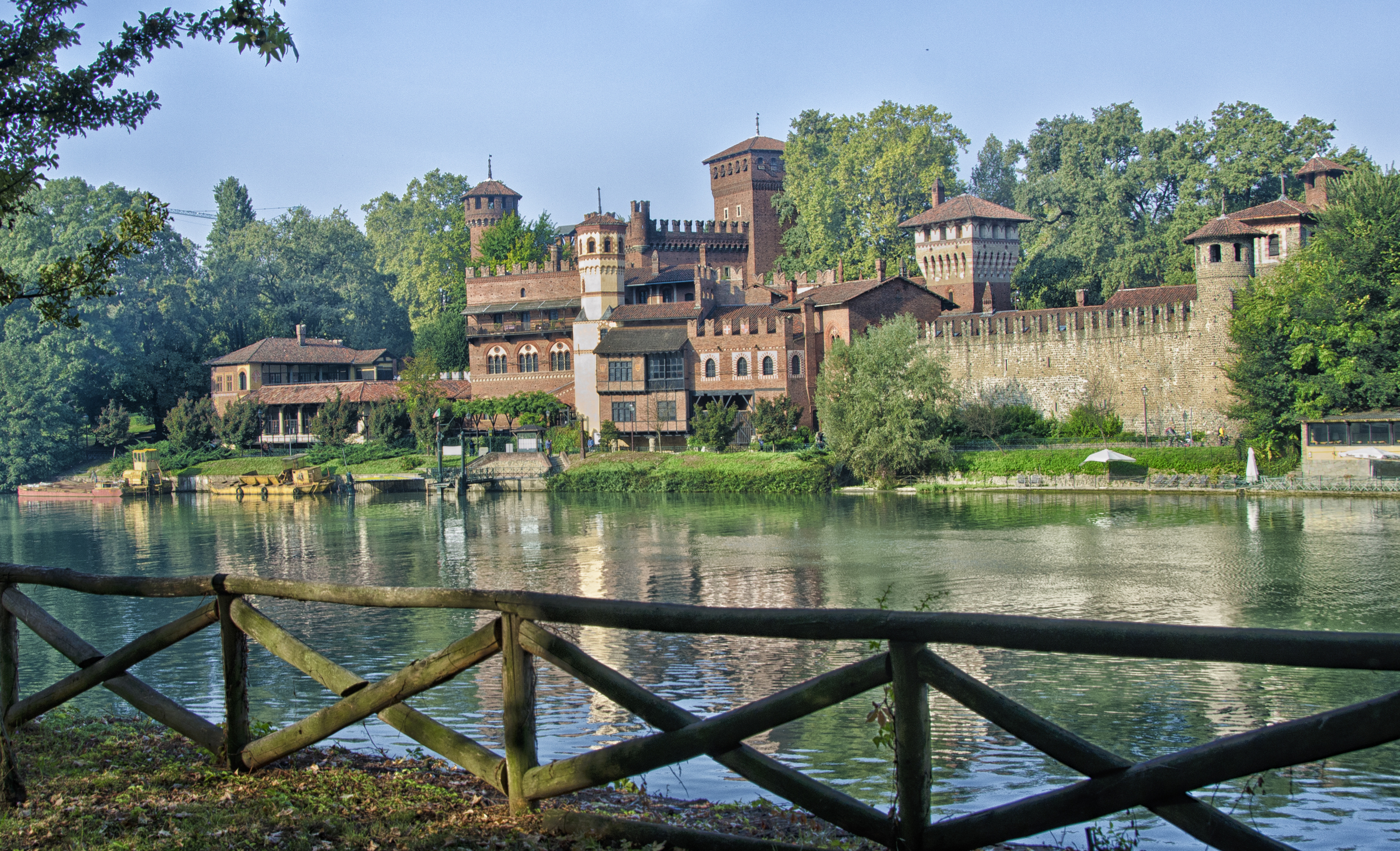
The Borgo in Valentino Park

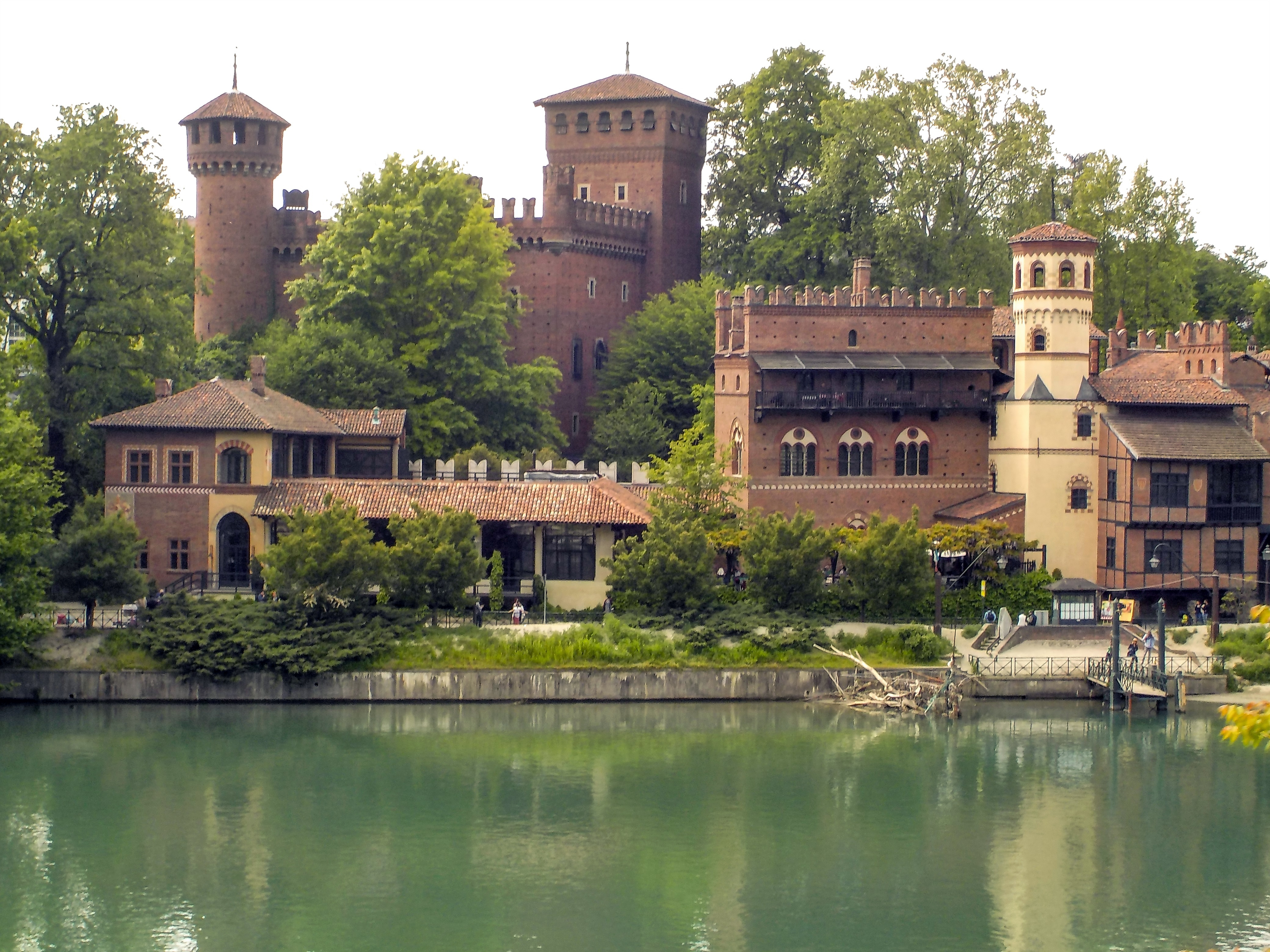
The Borgo on the river

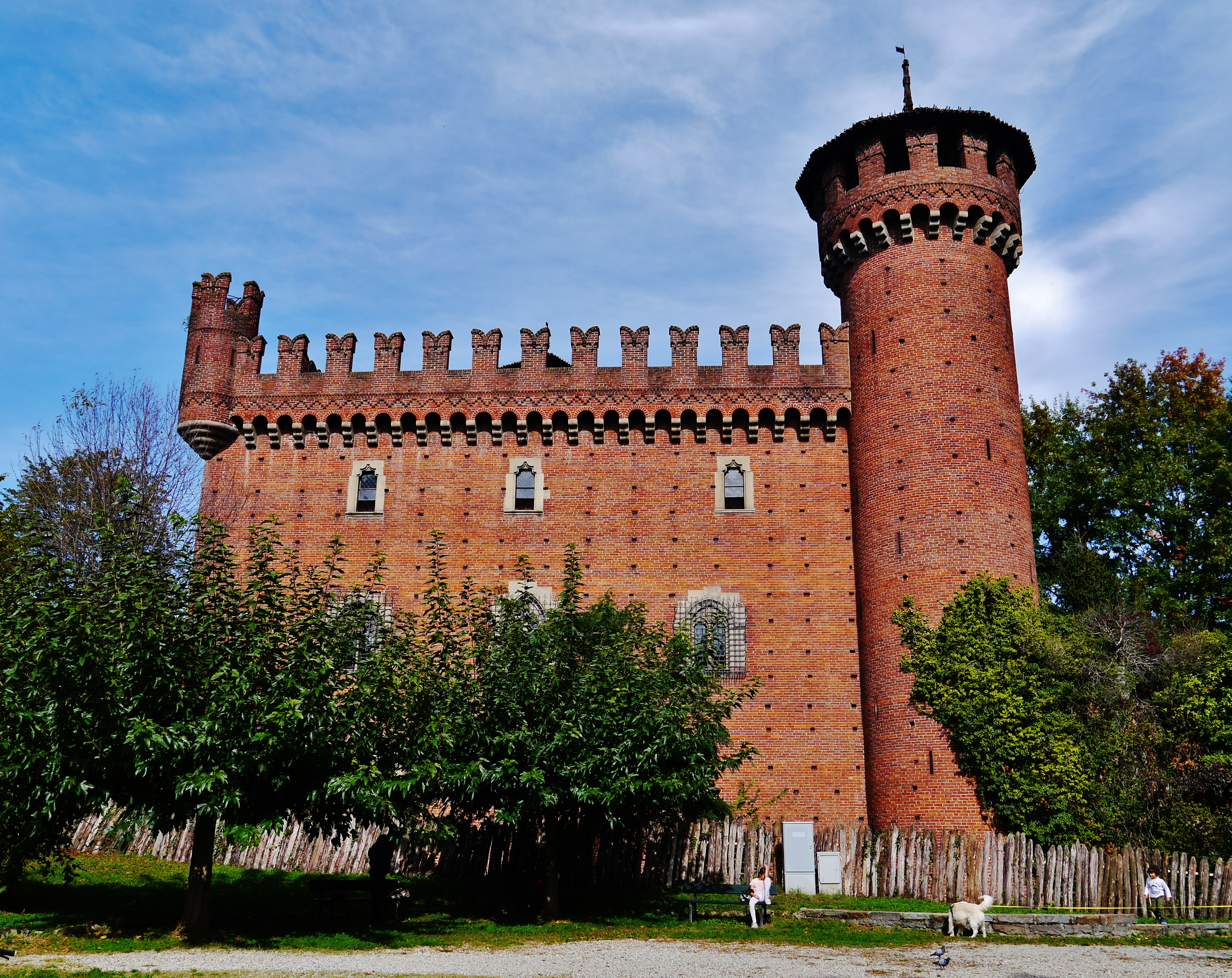
The Castle, inspired mostly by those Fénis, Verrès, Montaldo Dora and Ivrea

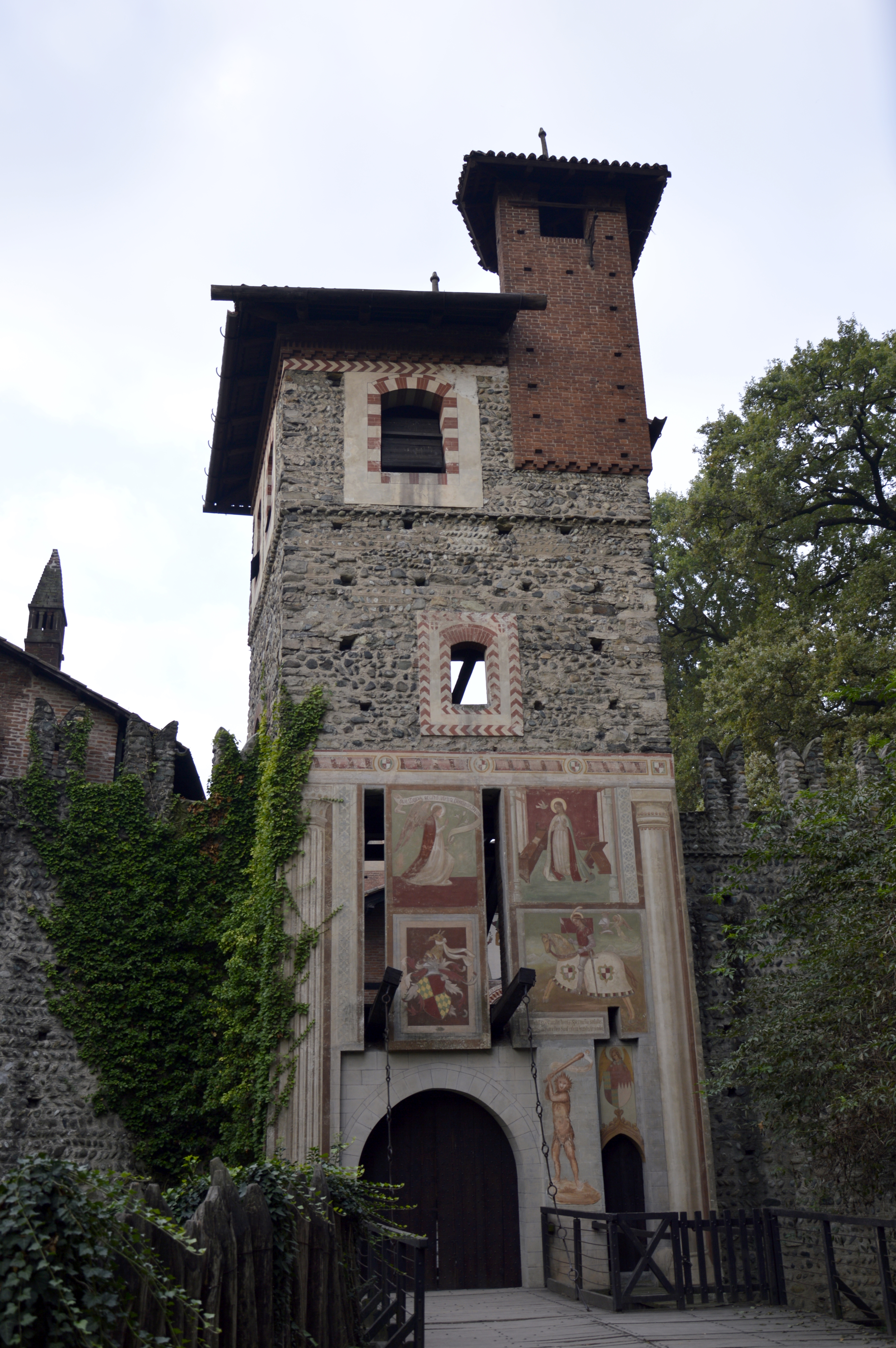
The drawbridge (inspired by the tower at Oglianico)

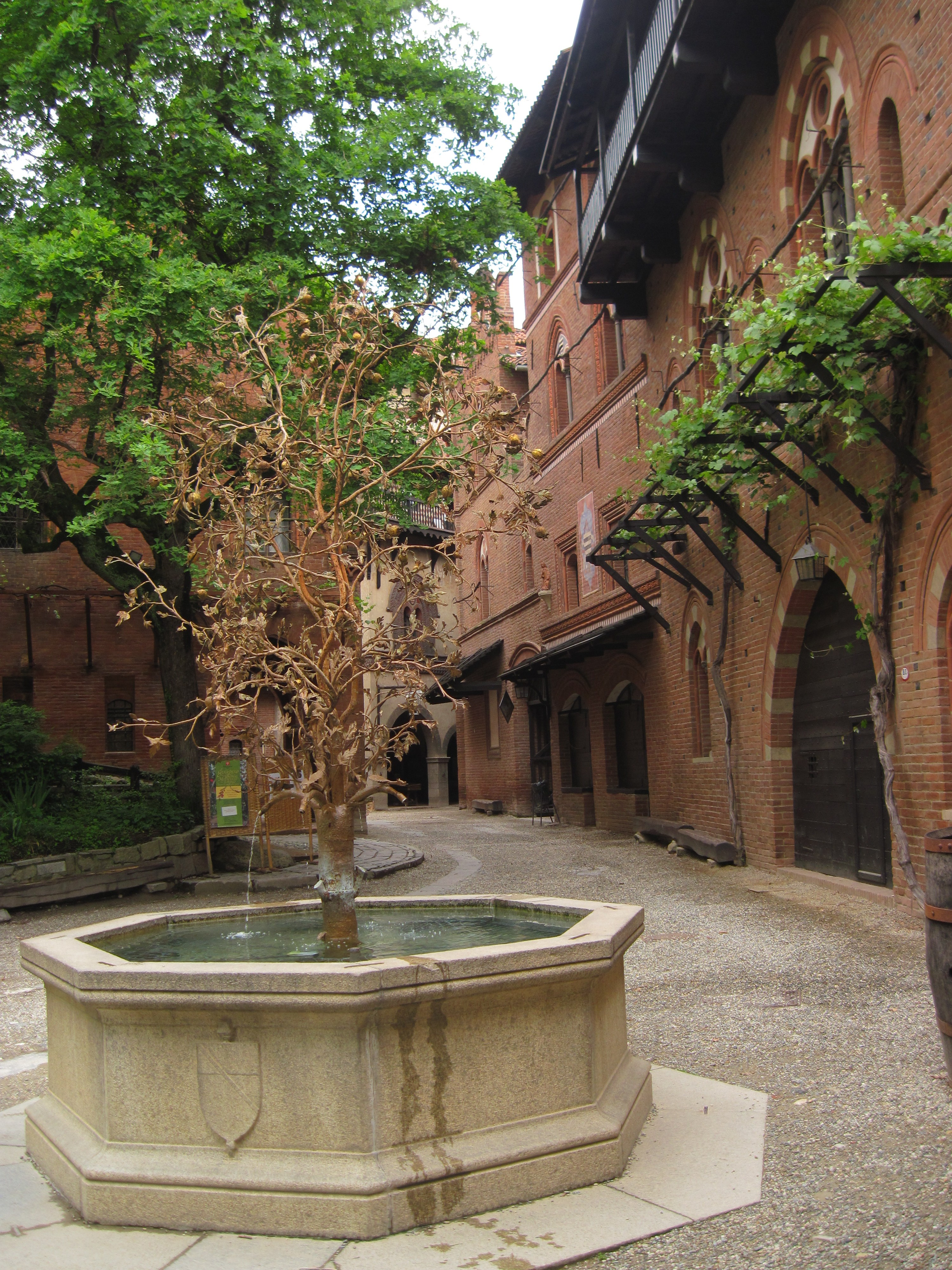
Pomegranate fountain (copy of the one at the castle of Issogne)

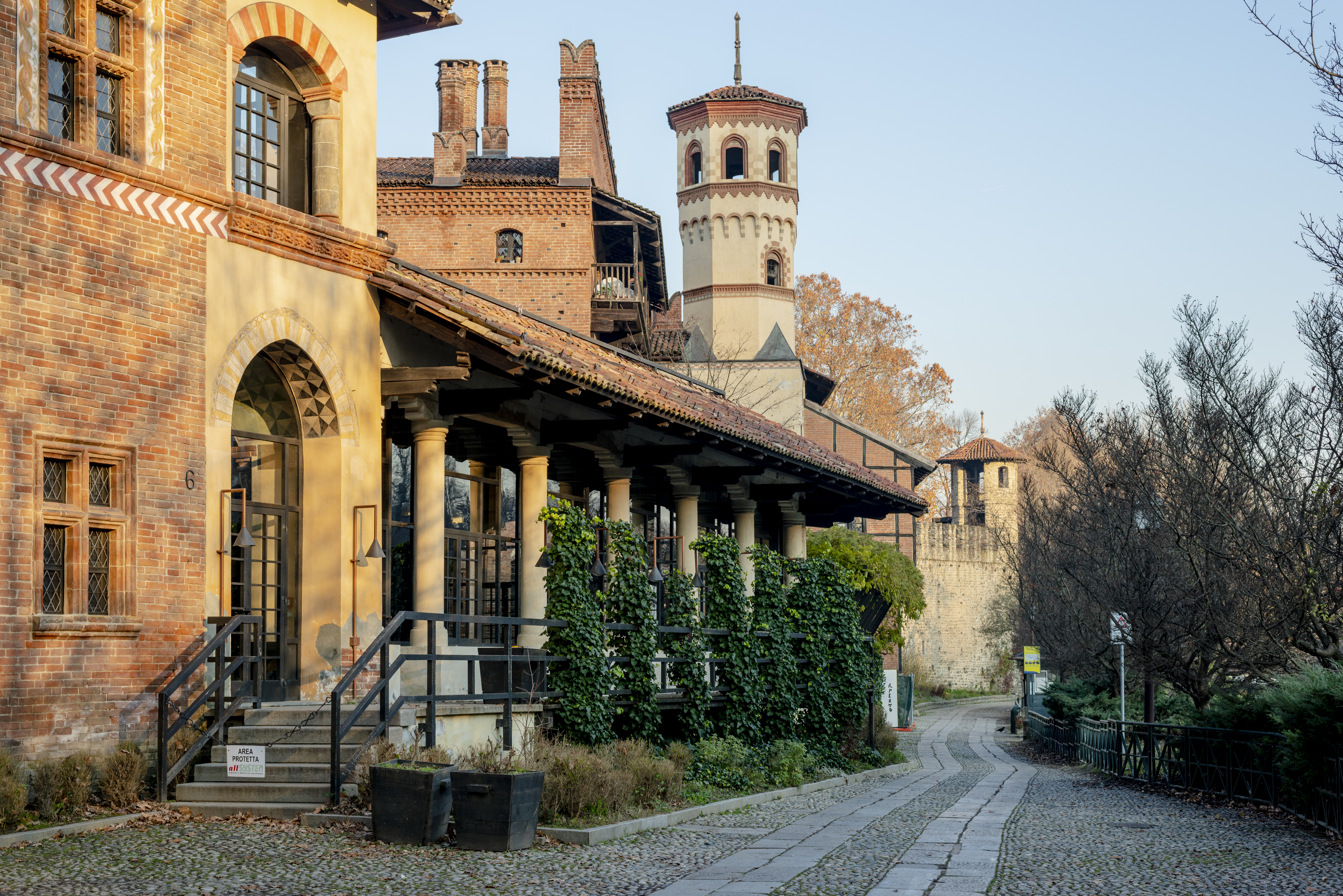
Riverwalk (with the tower from Avigliana)

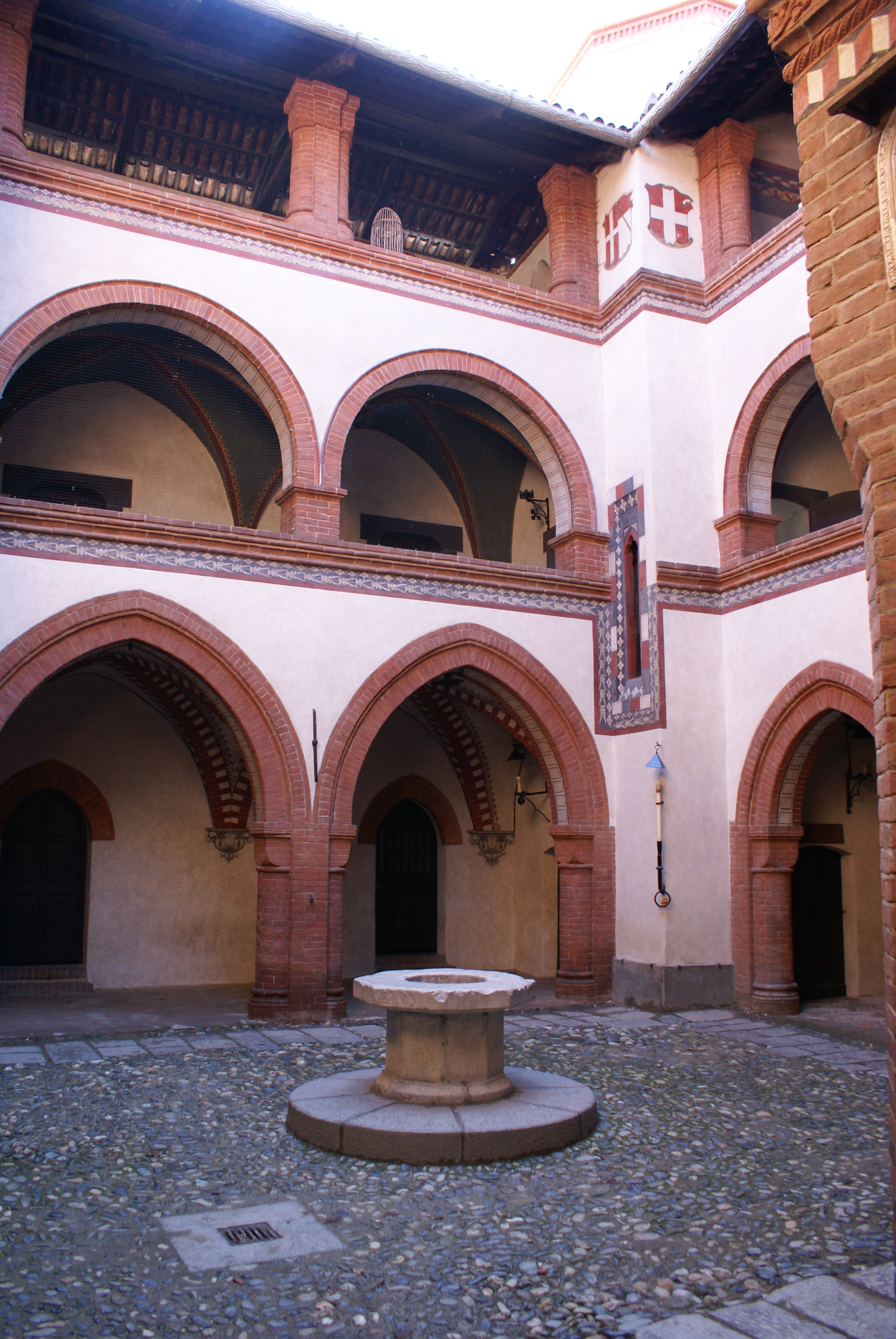
Courtyard (copy of the one in Avigliana)

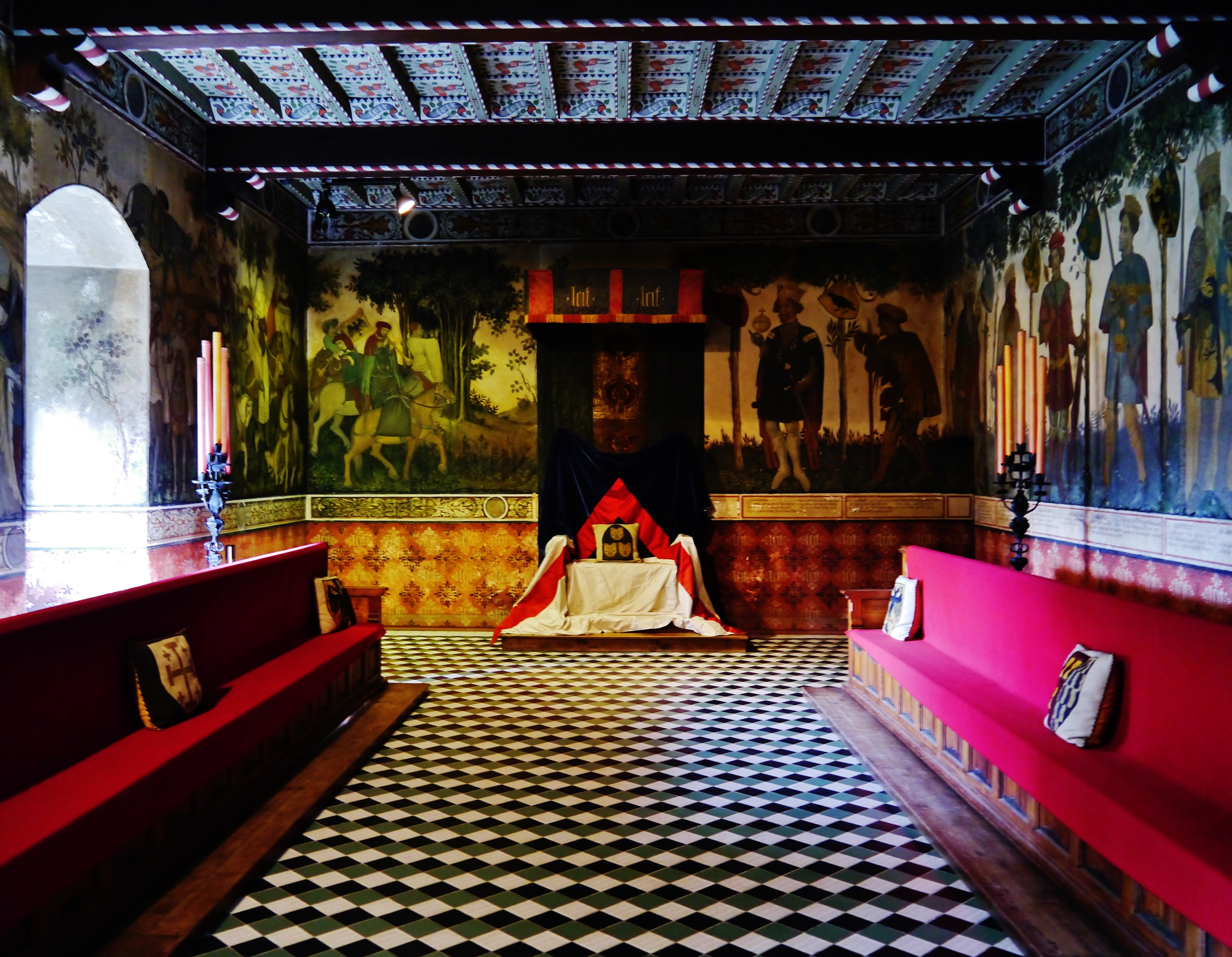
Interior room in the castle

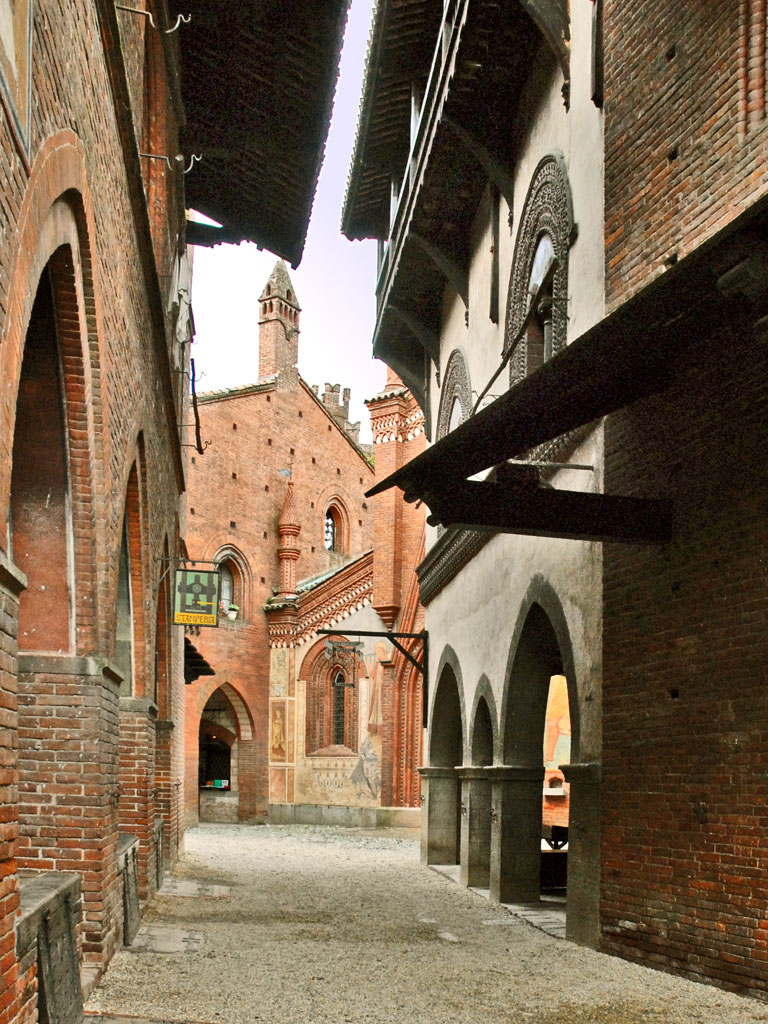
Main street and church (inspired by the ones in Saluzzo and Ciriè)
