= James F. Boccardo =

American trial lawyer, businessman, and philanthropist

James F. Boccardo (July 1, 1911–March 17, 2003) was an American trial lawyer, businessman, and philanthropist from Santa Clara County, California. Boccardo "was a standout in the flamboyant brotherhood of personal-injury lawyers."

== Early life and education ==
Boccardo was born on July 1, 1911, in San Francisco, to Italian immigrant parents from Genoa. His father, John H. Boccardo, was a leader in the local Italian community and was vice president of the Bank of Italy, the forerunner to the Bank of America. Boccardo grew up in Los Altos, California, where he was privately tutored.

Boccardo received his A.B. in chemical engineering from San Jose State University in 1931. He then attended Stanford Law School, earning his L.L.B. and J.D. in 1934.

== Career ==
Boccardo then became known as a trial lawyer based in San Jose, California, practicing both torts and criminal defense. He practiced for eight years before opening his own firm. He was well known for representing, with well-known San Francisco criminal defense attorney George T. Davis, the defendant in the 1946 Thomas Talle murder trial. Talle, a millionaire cattleman from New Mexico, was accused of murdering his wife in their home in Monte Sereno. The case was widely publicized in the media. Boccardo acted as both the lawyer and witness for the defense. Found guilty at the first trial, the conviction was reversed on appeal due to a technicality. Boccardo also represented San Francisco Mayor Joseph Alioto in a libel suit against Look, after the magazine suggested that the mayor was connected to the Mafia.

Boccardo was a pioneer in the use of visual aids, models, and videotape as courtroom exhibits to explain complex facts. In 1970, Boccardo appeared in the Guinness Book of World Records for winning $3.6 million in a personal injury case, at the time the largest such verdict. After his death, Santa Clara County District Attorney George Kennedy said that Boccardo's "reputation was one of the first things I knew about this area. He is the legal skyscraper of this area—and in the country, really. He was at the top of his game in criminal law and pioneered the way civil cases were handled in court." During his life, Boccardo was profiled in Time and Forbes magazines.

In addition to his legal practice, Boccardo engaged in business and banking. He was a defense contractor during World War II, organizing the San Jose Manufacturers, a non-profit coalition of small machine shops that produced 105-mm gun carriages for the U.S. Army in San Jose. Boccardo also created a forge and shipbuilding facility for the Navy, another-not-for-profit venture, during the war.

Boccardo formed the Western Gravel Company, which merged with another company and became the largest concrete and building materials supplier in Santa Clara County. In 1963, Boccardo established the Community Bank of San Jose, which later became California Commerce Bank, now owned by Grupo Financiero Banamex.

Boccardo was also known for a tax law case brought by Boccardo and his wife, Boccardo v. Commissioner of Internal Revenue. In that case in 1987, the Ninth Circuit ruled in favor of Boccardo, reversing the United States Tax Court. The case changed how attorney-client contracts were taxed.

Boccardo was a member of the Inner Circle of Advocates. Described as "mercurial" and "well-dressed," with a "neat, trimmed mustache," he had homes in Los Gatos, Palm Springs, and Pebble Beach. According to one story, Boccardo and Melvin Belli once "drove down the Spanish Steps in Rome in a rented Rolls-Royce" together.

According to the California, U.S., Divorce Index, in October 1971, after 34 years of marriage, Boccardo's wife, Lorraine Vernon Dimmett Boccardo (10 Feb 1917 - 27 Nov 2005), filed for divorce citing irreconcilable differences. She asked the court to allow her $10,850 a month (equivalent to approximately $71,000 in 2021) temporary maintenance and support pending trial in a divorce action brought against her husband. She also sought a restraining order to prevent him from "unsolicited visits" and indicated that she feared personal harassment. They were married in San Jose on November 13, 1936.

== Retirement ==
After retiring from the practice of law, Boccardo increased his philanthropic activities. He was a major benefactor of San Jose State University; in 1997, he gave $2 million for renovations to the business school building (later renamed the James F. Boccardo Business Education Center). Boccardo also donated to the university gate project, and the gate at Fourth Street and Paseo de San Carlos was renamed the Boccardo Gate in his honor. The university awarded Boccardo and his wife the Tower Award in 1998.

Boccardo was named a commander of the Order of the Star of Italian Solidarity in 1970. He also received the 2002 Achievement Award of the Italian American Heritage Foundation.

Boccardo also contributed to homelessness projects. In 1997, he gave funds for a 250-bed homeless shelter for the San Jose Emergency Housing Consortium, the James F. Boccardo Regional Reception Center. Boccardo also endowed the John H. Boccardo Family Living Center. In 2002, Boccardo funded the creation of the Boccardo Trail Corridor at Alum Rock Park, a hiking and equestrian trail, and doubling the amount of protected land at the park.

Boccardo died in his sleep at age 91 on March 17, 2003, in Los Gatos, California. He was survived by his wife of 67 years, Lorraine; a son, John Boccardo II of Sausalito, California; a daughter, Leanne Rees of Maryland; two grandsons James "Jim" Rees of Los Gatos and Evan Rees of New Mexico; and a great-grandson, Zachary Rees.
