= Parco del Valentino =

Public park in Turin, Italy

Coordinates: 45.054°N 7.686°E

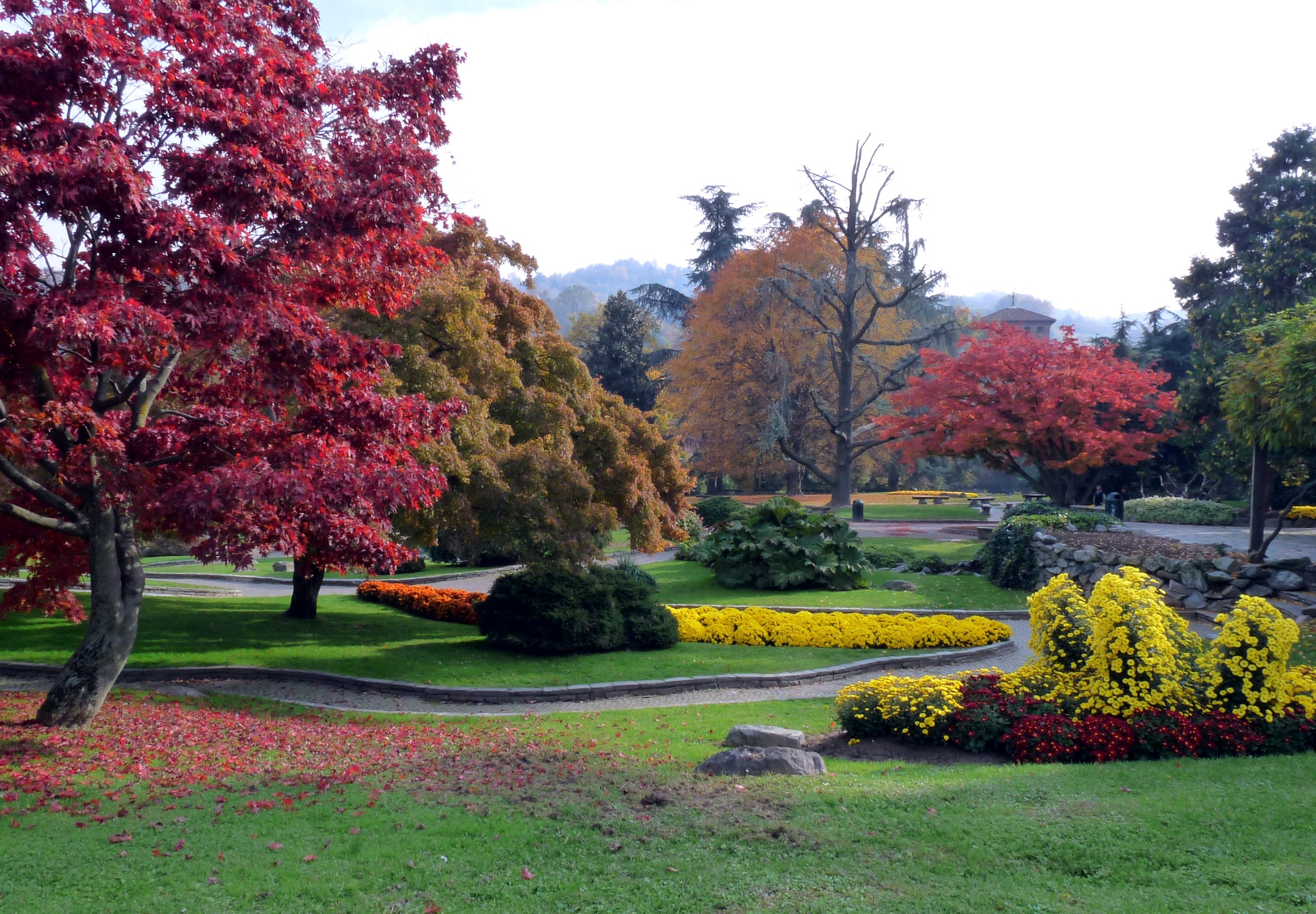
Parco del Valentino

Parco del Valentino (also known as Valentino Park) is a popular public park in Turin, Italy. It is located along the west bank of the Po river. It covers an area of 500,000m², which makes it Turin's second largest park (Turin's largest park, the 840,000m² Pellerina Park, is Italy's most extended urban green area). This park has been nominated “The best Italian park” after a selection among the fifteen best Italian parks.

== History ==
The Parco del Valentino was opened by the city of Turin in 1856, and was Italy’s first public garden.

It hosted the Eurovision Village during the Eurovision Song Contest 2022.

== Racing circuit ==
Between 1935 and 1955 an occasional series of motorsport events were held on the roads within the park, including the 1946 Turin Grand Prix, popularly considered the first Formula One race, and the 1948 Italian Grand Prix. These races were generally known as the Gran Premio del Valentino.

Year	Race title	Race winner	Car	Circuit Length	Report
1935	I Gran Premio del Valentino	(Italy) Tazio Nuvolari	Alfa Romeo Tipo B	4.088 km (2.540 mi)	Report
1937	Circuito di Torino	(Norway) Eugen Bjørnstad	ERA A-Type	2.926 km (1.818 mi)	Report
1937	II Gran Premio del Valentino	(Italy) Antonio Brivio	Alfa Romeo 12C-36	2.926 km (1.818 mi)	Report
1946	Coppa Brezzi	(Italy) Piero Dusio	Cisitalia D46	4.720 km (2.933 mi)	Report
1946	Turin Grand Prix	(Italy) Achille Varzi	Alfa Romeo 158	4.720 km (2.933 mi)	Report
1947	IV Gran Premio del Valentino	(France) Raymond Sommer	Ferrari 159 S	4.801 km (2.983 mi)	Report
1948	Italian Grand Prix	(France) Jean-Pierre Wimille	Alfa Romeo 158	4.801 km (2.983 mi)	Report
1952	VI Gran Premio del Valentino	(Italy) Luigi Villoresi	Ferrari 375	4.196 km (2.607 mi)	Report
1955	VII Gran Premio del Valentino	(Italy) Alberto Ascari	Lancia D50	4.200 km (2.610 mi)	Report

=== Layout history ===
Gran Premio del Valentino Layout History
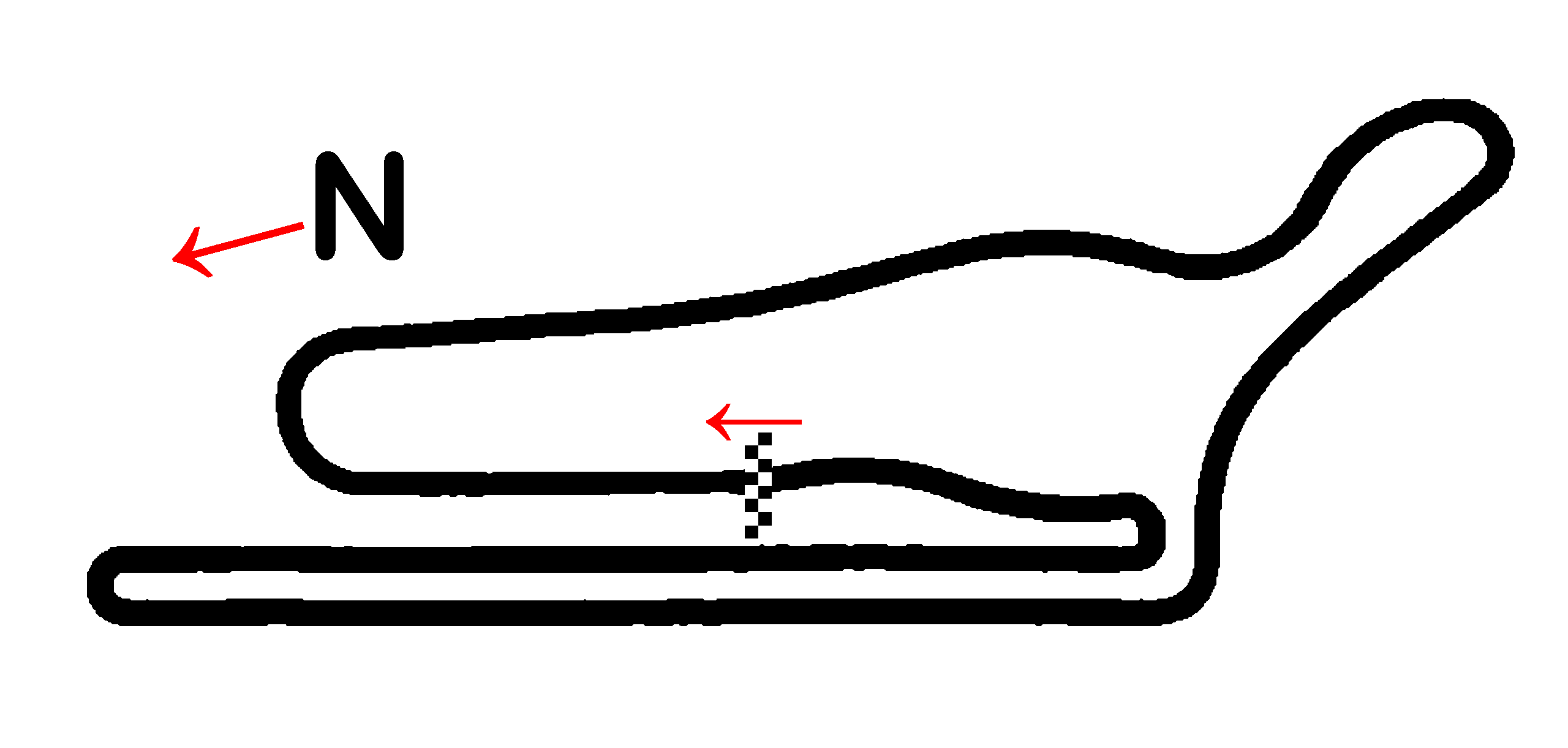
Grand Prix Circuit (1946)

Grand Prix Circuit (1947–1948)

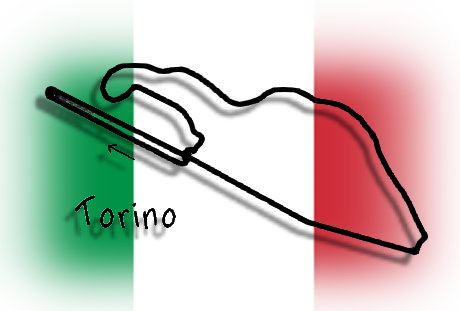
Grand Prix Circuit (1952)

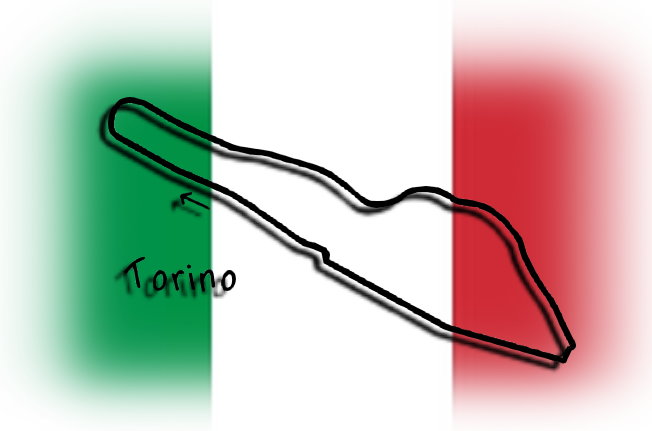
Grand Prix Circuit (1955)

== Park contents ==
Buildings within the park include:

- The Botanical Gardens
- The Baroque Castle (Castello del Valentino)
- Medieval Castle and Village
- The Torino Esposizioni and Underground Pavilion Complex
- Società Promotrice delle Belle Arti
- Villa Glicini

== Gallery ==
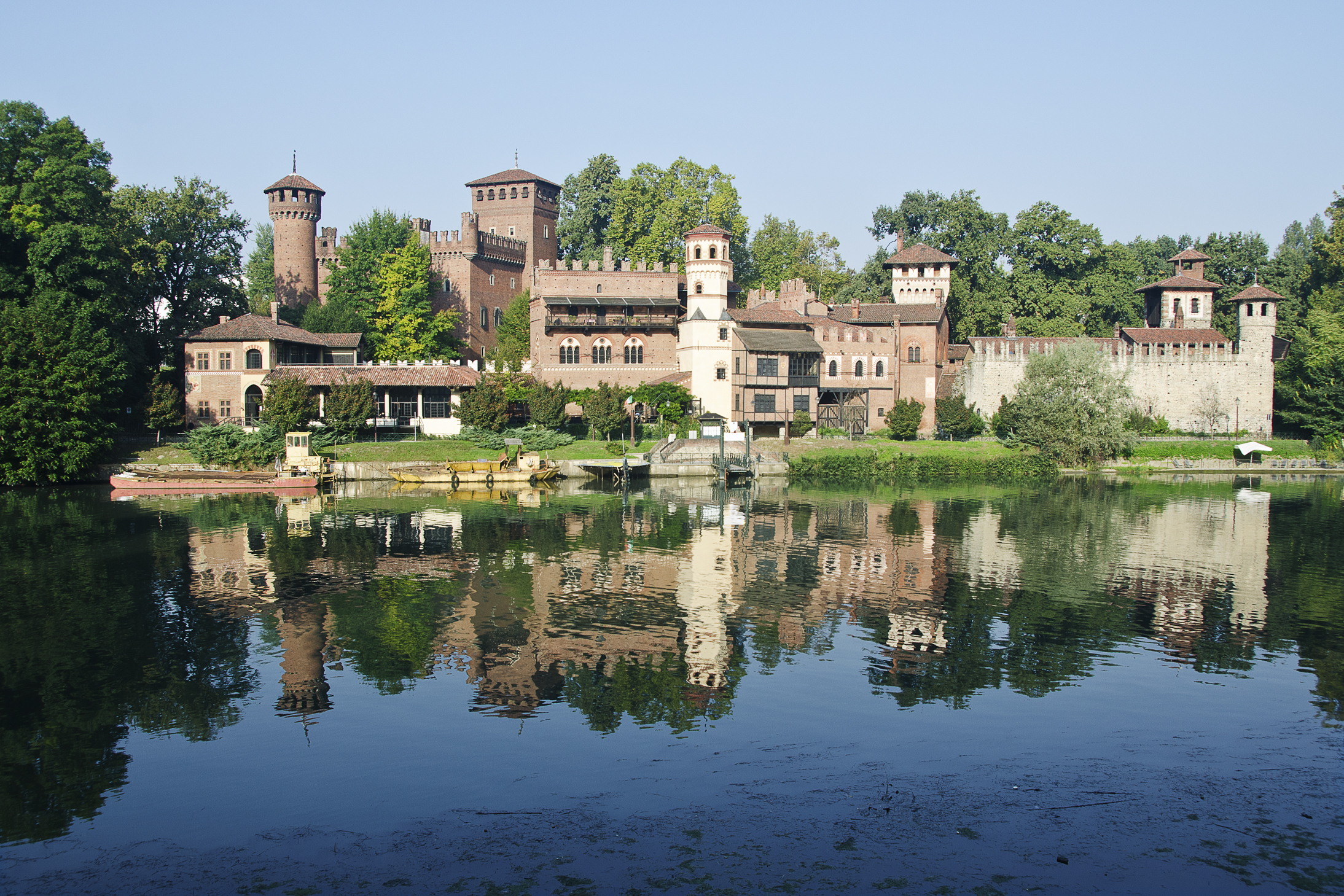
The Borgo Medioevale in Valentino Park.

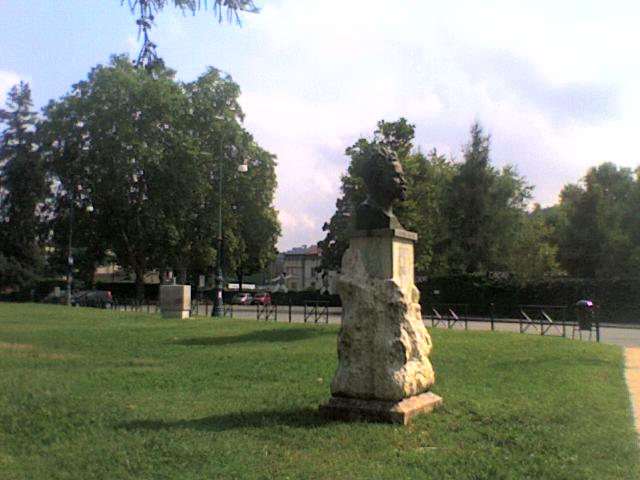
Statue of Cesare Battisti in Valentino Park.

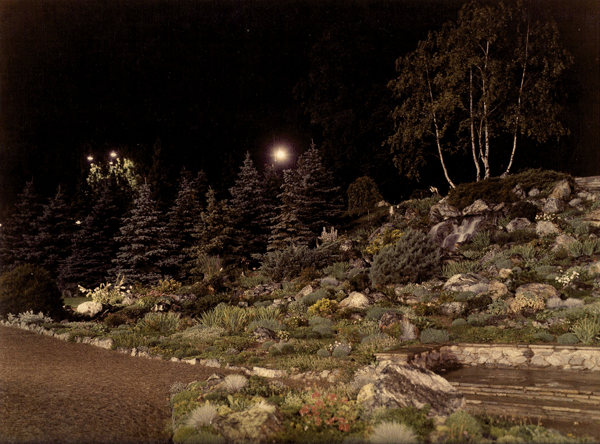
Suggestive view of the lighting of a rock garden of Valentino Park, created by Guido Chiarelli for Expo 61

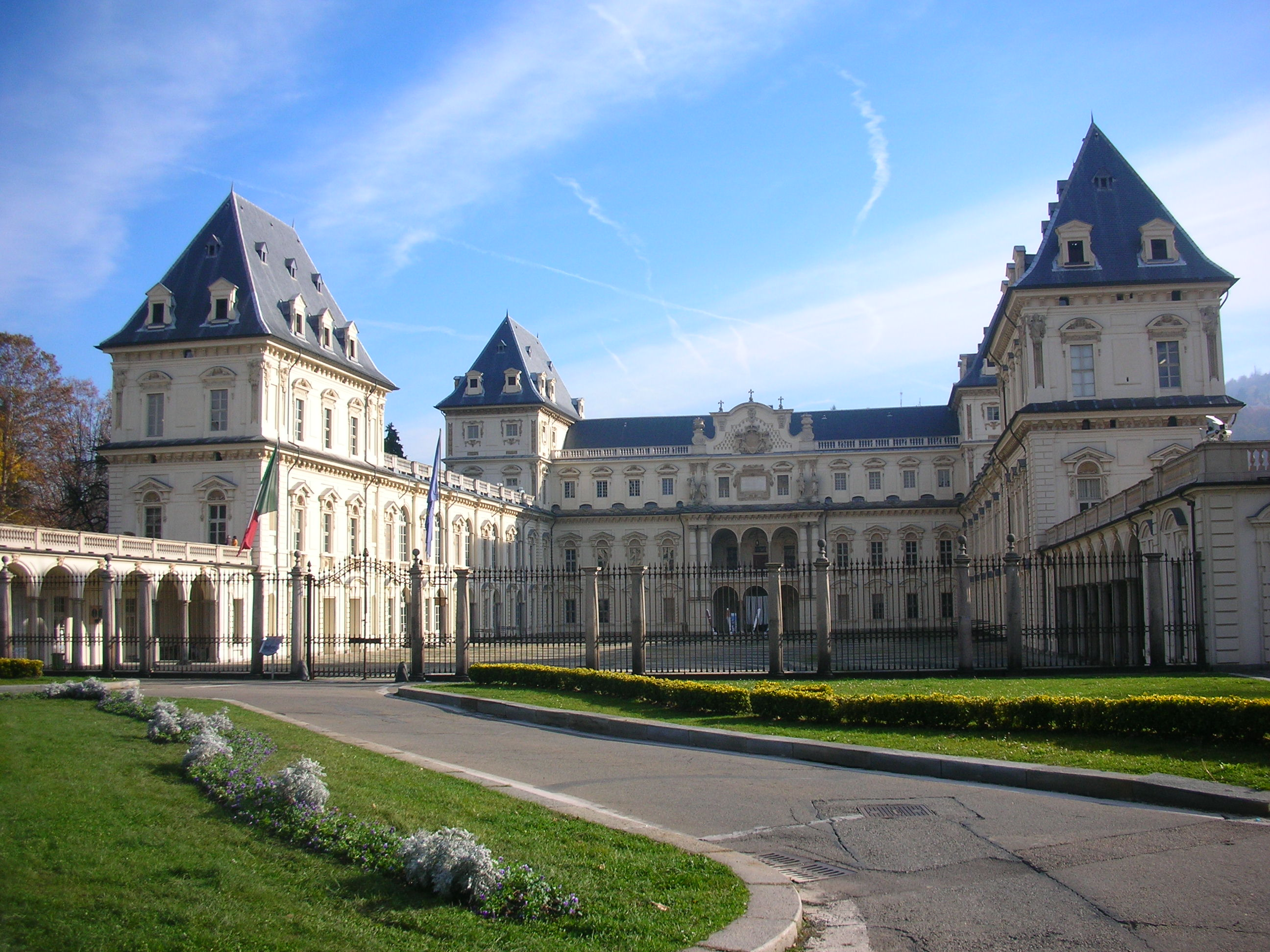
The Castello del Valentino

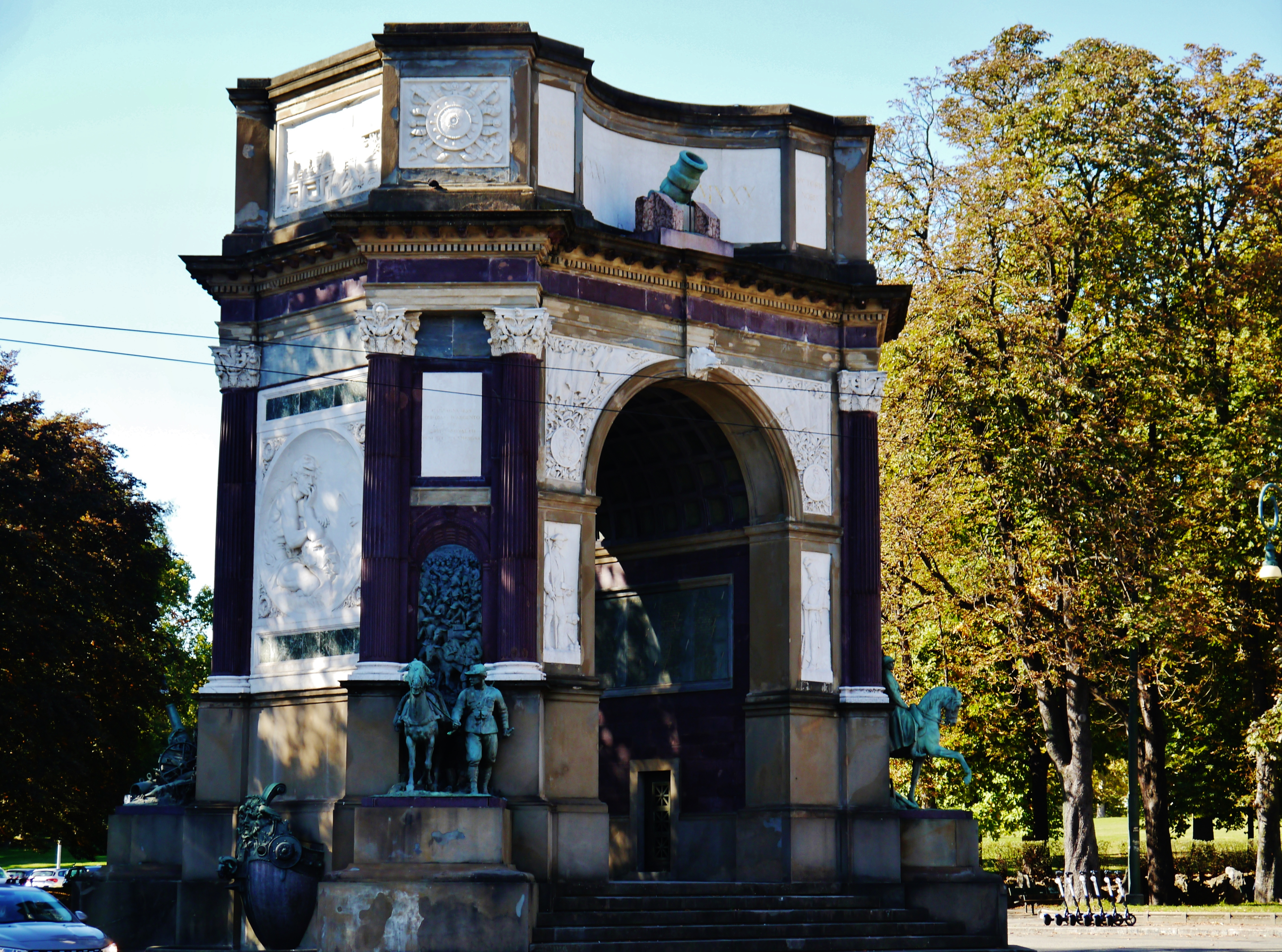
Arco del Valentino

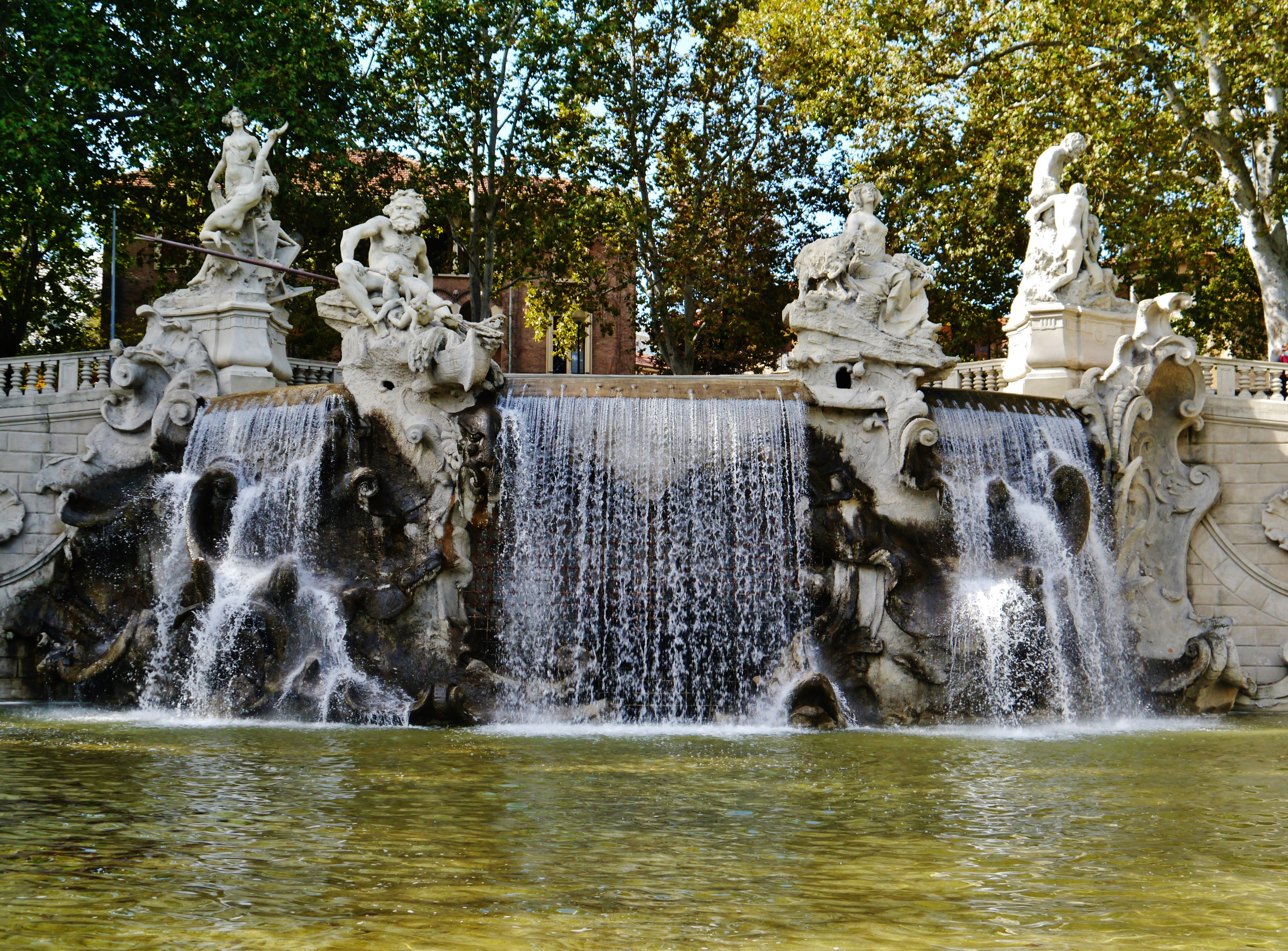
Fontana dei 12 mesi (Fountain of the 12 months)
