= Giuseppina De Muro =

Italian Roman Catholic nun (1903-1965)

Suor Giuseppina De Muro FdC

Personal life
- Born: November 2, 1903 Lanusei, Sardinia, Italy
- Died: October 22, 1965 (aged 61) Turin, Italy

Religious life
- Religion: Roman Catholic
- Order: Figlie della Carità di San Vincenzo de Paoli (Daughters of Charity of St. Vincent de Paul)

Giuseppina De Muro (or Demuro) (1903–1965) was an Italian Roman Catholic nun who saved over 500 people from concentration camps during the German occupation of Italy.

She was born Rosina De Muro in 1903 in Lanusei, Sardinia. Sister De Muro was a member of the religious congregation Figlie della Carità di San Vincenzo De' Paoli (Daughters of Charity of St. Vincent de Paul). She spent most of her life in Turin, Italy, serving from 1925 until her death.

She is credited with saving the lives of over 500 people by preventing their deportation from Le Nuove prison to Nazi concentration camps. Among those she saved was Italian essayist Massimo Foa, who was nine months old when she smuggled him out of the prison in a load of dirty sheets. He was taken in by Clotilde Roda Boggia ("mamma Tilde") in Turin, who raised him as a son. One way sister De Muro saved people was by inventing a disease and then having them transferred to a local hospital.

Sister De Muro wrote a report for Cardinal Archbishop Maurilio Fossati, who had urged Catholics to take Jewish refugees into their homes, describing the horrors and the suffering. To support her claim, Father Ruggero Cipolla, OFM (1911-2006), the prison chaplain, wrote to him as well, saying that everything she related was true.

Yad Vashem, Israel's official Holocaust memorial in Jerusalem, named her Righteous Among the Nations. The Jewish Community of Turin presented the award at Le Nuove prison, which is now a museum, on December 3, 2024.

In 2018 a trailer was released for a documentary film about her life, "Suor Giuseppina Demuro - La dignità di una donna" (Sister Giuseppina Demura - The dignity of a woman"). Its director is Paolo Damosso, who also made films about Italian religious figures Clelia Merloni, saint Giuseppe Benedetto Cottolengo and saint Padre Pio.
