= Maurilio Fossati =

Italian Cardinal

His Eminence Maurilio Fossati O.SS.G.C.N.
- Cardinal, Archbishop of Turin
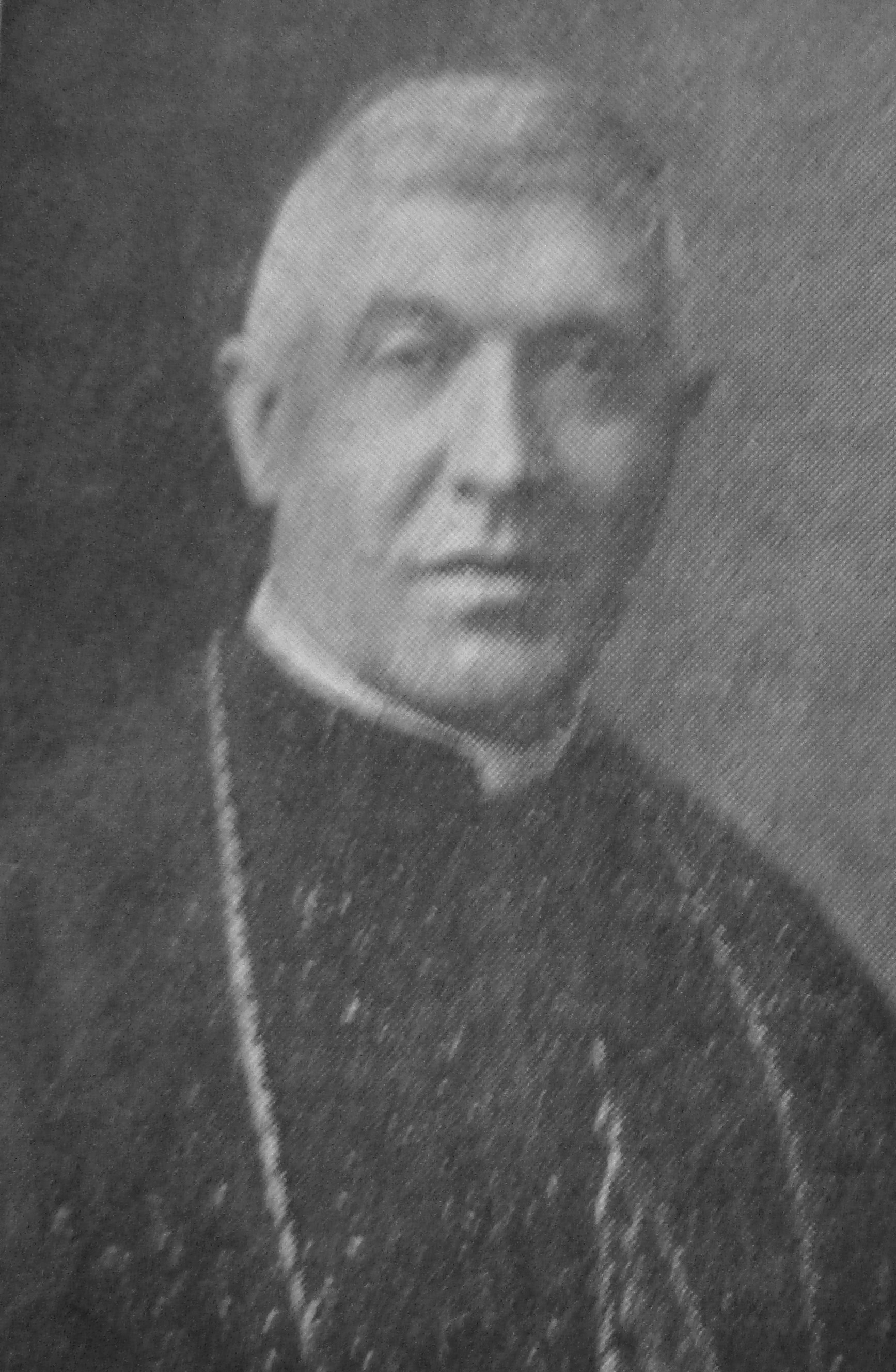
- Church: Roman Catholic Church
- Archdiocese: Turin
- See: Turin
- Appointed: 11 December 1930
- Term ended: 30 March 1965
- Other post: Cardinal-Priest of San Marcello (1933-65)
- Previous posts: Bishop of Galtellì-Nuoro (1924-28); Apostolic Administrator of Ogliastra (1925-27); Bishop of Nuoro (1928-29); Archbishop of Sassari (1929-30); President of the Italian Episcopal Conference (1954-58)

Orders
- Ordination: 27 November 1898
- Consecration: 27 April 1925 by Giuseppe Gamba
- Created cardinal: 13 March 1933 by Pope Pius XI
- Rank: Cardinal-Priest

Personal details
- Born: Maurilio Fossati; 24 May 1876 Arona, Kingdom of Italy
- Died: 30 March 1965 (aged 88) Turin, Italy
- Buried: Santuario della Consolata
- Denomination: Roman Catholic
- Motto: Dirige gressus meos
- Coat of arms

Maurilio Fossati, O.SS.G.C.N., (24 May 1876 – 30 March 1965) was an Italian cardinal of the Roman Catholic Church who served as Archbishop of Turin from 1930 until his death, and was elevated to the cardinalate in 1933.

== Biography ==
Born in Arona, Fossati studied at the seminary in Novara before being ordained to the priesthood on 27 November 1898. He was private secretary to Edoardo Pulciano, the Bishop of Novara, later the Archbishop of Genoa, from 1901 to 1911, the year when Fossati entered the Oblates of Saints Gaudentius and Charles of Novara, a society of apostolic life of priests of the diocese. Fossati then did pastoral work in Novara until 1914. After serving as a military chaplain during World War I, he was made superior of his Society in Varallo Sesia in 1919.

On 24 March 1924, Fossati was appointed Bishop of Nuoro by Pope Pius XI. He received his episcopal consecration on the following 27 April from Archbishop Giuseppe Gamba, and was then Apostolic Administrator of Ogliastra from 1925 to 1927. Fossati was later named Archbishop of Sassari on 2 October 1929, and archbishop of Turin on 11 December 1930.

Pope Pius created him Cardinal-Priest of San Marcello al Corso in the consistory of 13 March 1933. Fossati was one of the cardinal electors who participated in the 1939 papal conclave (at which he was considered papabile) which selected Pope Pius XII, and again voted in the 1958 conclave, resulting in the election of Pope John XXIII.

During World War II, the Cardinal was an outspoken opponent of Fascism, and asked that Catholics take Jewish refugees and Gypsies into their homes. Fossati convinced the German Army to avoid Turin, thus sparing the city from devastation, in its 1945 retreat. Of Catholics in the Italian Resistance, Peter Hebblethwaite wrote that, by early 1944, some 20,000 partisans had emerged from Catholic Action. Known as the "Green Flames", they were supported by sympathetic provincial clergy in the North, who pronounced the Germans to be "unjust invaders", whom it was lawful and meritorious to repel. "Bishops tended to be more cautious", wrote Hebblethwaite, but Maurilio Fossati "visited partisan units in the mountains, heard their confessions and said Mass for them." Sister Giuseppina De Muro, who has been named Righteous Among the Nations by Israel's holocaust remembrance group, Yad Vashem, wrote to him of the horrors at Le Nuove prison in Turin, and Father Ruggero Cipolla followed with a letter of his own, corroborating her claims. Sister De Muro eventually saved over 500 Jewish people from being shipped to Nazi concentration camps, although Cardinal Fossati's actual role in the success of the efforts, if any, is unknown.

From 1962 to 1965, he attended the Second Vatican Council, and then served as an elector at the conclave of 1963, which selected Pope Paul VI.

Cardinal Fossati died from pneumonia in Turin, at age 88. He was initially buried at the chapel in the Seminary of Rivoli, but his remains were transferred to the Santuario della Consolata in 1977.

== See also ==
- Brigate Fiamme Verdi

Catholic Church titles
Preceded by Luca Canepa	Bishop of Nuoro; 1924–1929	Succeeded by Giuseppe Cogoni
Preceded by Cleto Cassani	Archbishop of Sassari; 1929–1930	Succeeded by Arcangelo Mazzotti, OFM
Preceded by Giuseppe Gamba	Archbishop of Turin; 1930–1965	Succeeded by Michele Pellegrino
Preceded by Adeodato Giovanni Piazza, OCD	President of the Italian Episcopal Conference; 1954–1958	Succeeded by Giuseppe Siri
