= Agostino Richelmy =

Italian Roman Catholic Cardinal

His Eminence Agostino Richelmy
- Cardinal; Archbishop of Turin
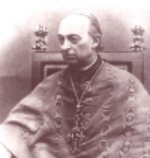
- The cardinal pictured in 1910.
- Archdiocese: Turin
- See: Turin
- Appointed: 26 July 1897
- Installed: 28 November 1897
- Term ended: 10 August 1923
- Predecessor: Davide Riccardi
- Successor: Giuseppe Gamba
- Other post: Cardinal-Priest of Santa Maria in Via (1911-23)
- Previous posts: Bishop of Ivrea (1886-97); Cardinal-Priest of Sant'Eusebio (1899-1911)

Orders
- Ordination: 25 April 1873 by Lorenzo Gastaldi
- Consecration: 28 October 1886 by Gaetano Alimonda
- Created cardinal: 19 June 1899 by Pope Leo XIII
- Rank: Cardinal-Priest

Personal details
- Born: Agostino Richelmy; 29 November 1850 Turin, Kingdom of Sardinia
- Died: 10 August 1923 (aged 72) Turin, Kingdom of Italy
- Buried: Santuario della Consolata (since 1927)
- Parents: Prospero Richelmy; Lidia Realis
- Coat of arms

Agostino Richelmy (29 November 1850 – 10 August 1923) was an Italian cardinal of the Roman Catholic Church who served as Archbishop of Turin from 1897 until his death, and was elevated to the rank of cardinal in 1899.

== Biography ==
=== Early life and education ===
Born in Turin, Agostino Richelmy studied at the Theological Faculty of the University of Turin. He received his confirmation on 13 August 1857 and later joined the Garibaldian Volunteers in the War of 1866, wearing his red shirt under his cassock for years afterwards.

He attended Liceo classico Cavour and studied at the seminary in Turin, from where he obtained his doctorate in theology on 18 May 1876. He was ordained to the priesthood on 25 April 1873 and finished his studies three years later. Within the Archdiocese of Turin, Richelmy taught at its seminary, served as a prosynodal examiner, and was a canon of the cathedral chapter.

=== Episcopate ===
On 7 June 1886, he was appointed Bishop of Ivrea by Pope Leo XIII. Richelmy received his episcopal consecration on the following 28 October from Cardinal Gaetano Alimonda, with Bishops Davide Riccardi and Giovanni Bertagna serving as co-consecrators. He was later named Archbishop of Turin on 18 September 1897.

=== Cardinalate ===
Pope Leo created him cardinal priest of Sant'Eusebio in the consistory of 18 June 1899. After participating in the 1903 papal conclave, Richelmy's cardinalatial church was transferred to Santa Maria in Via on 27 November 1911. He was one of the cardinal electors in the conclave of 1914, and also in that of 1922, which selected Pope Benedict XV and Pope Pius XI respectively. In 1915, when Italy entered World War I, Richelmy organized priests for duty as army chaplains in the mountains of Trentino, where they carved altars out of snow and said Mass in below-zero temperatures.

The Cardinal died in Turin, at age 72. He was initially buried at the chapel for the clergy in the Turin cemetery, but his remains were transferred in 1927 to the Santuario della Consolata, where they lie in a pink marble sarcophagus.

Richelmy succeeded Davide Riccardi, who assisted in the former's episcopal consecration, as both Bishop of Ivrea and Archbishop of Turin.

== Publications ==
Several of his letters and sermons were later published including;

- Pastoral letter for Lent 1913
- Isasca's reader
- Virgil's Georgics
- Paragone

== Legacy ==
For his work during WWI, he was awarded the Grand Cordon of the Order of Saints Maurice and Lazarus.

Two of his sisters went on to become nuns.

Two retirement homes are named after him.

A street is named after him in Invea.

== Sources ==
- Harris M. Lentz (2002). Popes and Cardinals of the 20th Century: A Biographical Dictionary. London: McFarland & Company. pp. 155–156. ISBN 978-0-7864-1094-1.
- Vaudagnotti, Attilio (1926). Il cardinale Agostino Richelmy. Torino, Roma: Marietti, 1926.(in Italian)

Catholic Church titles
| Preceded by Davide Riccardi | Bishop of Ivrea; 7 June 1886–18 September 1897 | Succeeded by Matteo Angelo Filipello |
| Preceded by Davide Riccardi | Archbishop of Turin; 18 September 1897–10 August 1923 | Succeeded by Giuseppe Gamba |
