= Vialfrè =

- Comune
- Comune di Vialfrè
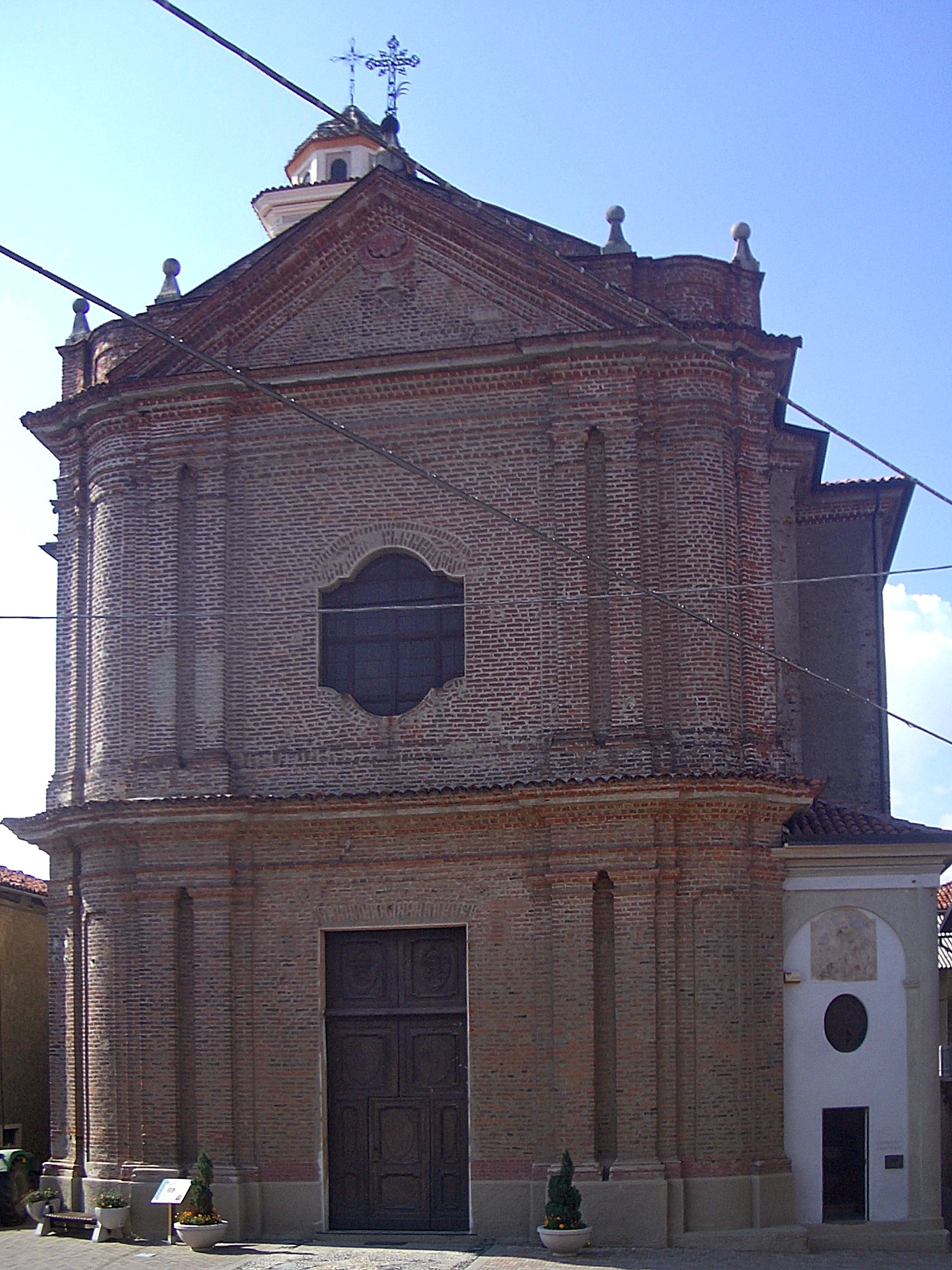
- Church of Saints Peter and Paul

- Location within Italy Location within Piedmont
- Coordinates: 45°23′N 7°49′E
- Country: Italy
- Region: Piedmont
- Metropolitan city: Turin (TO)

Government
  - Mayor: Pietro Gianoglio Vercellino

Area
  - Total: 4.5 km^{2} (1.7 sq mi)
- Elevation: 470 m (1,540 ft)

Population (30 November 2014)
  - Total: 262
  - Density: 58/km^{2} (150/sq mi)
- Demonym: Vialfredesi
- Time zone: UTC+1 (CET)
  - Summer (DST): UTC+2 (CEST)
- Postal code: 10090
- Dialing code: 0125

Vialfrè is a comune (municipality) in the Metropolitan City of Turin in the Italian region Piedmont, located about 35 km (22 mi) north of Turin.

Vialfrè borders the following municipalities: San Martino Canavese, Scarmagno, Agliè, and Cuceglio.
