= Torre Canavese Castle =

- Castello di Torre Canavese
- Torre Canavese, Piedmont, Italy
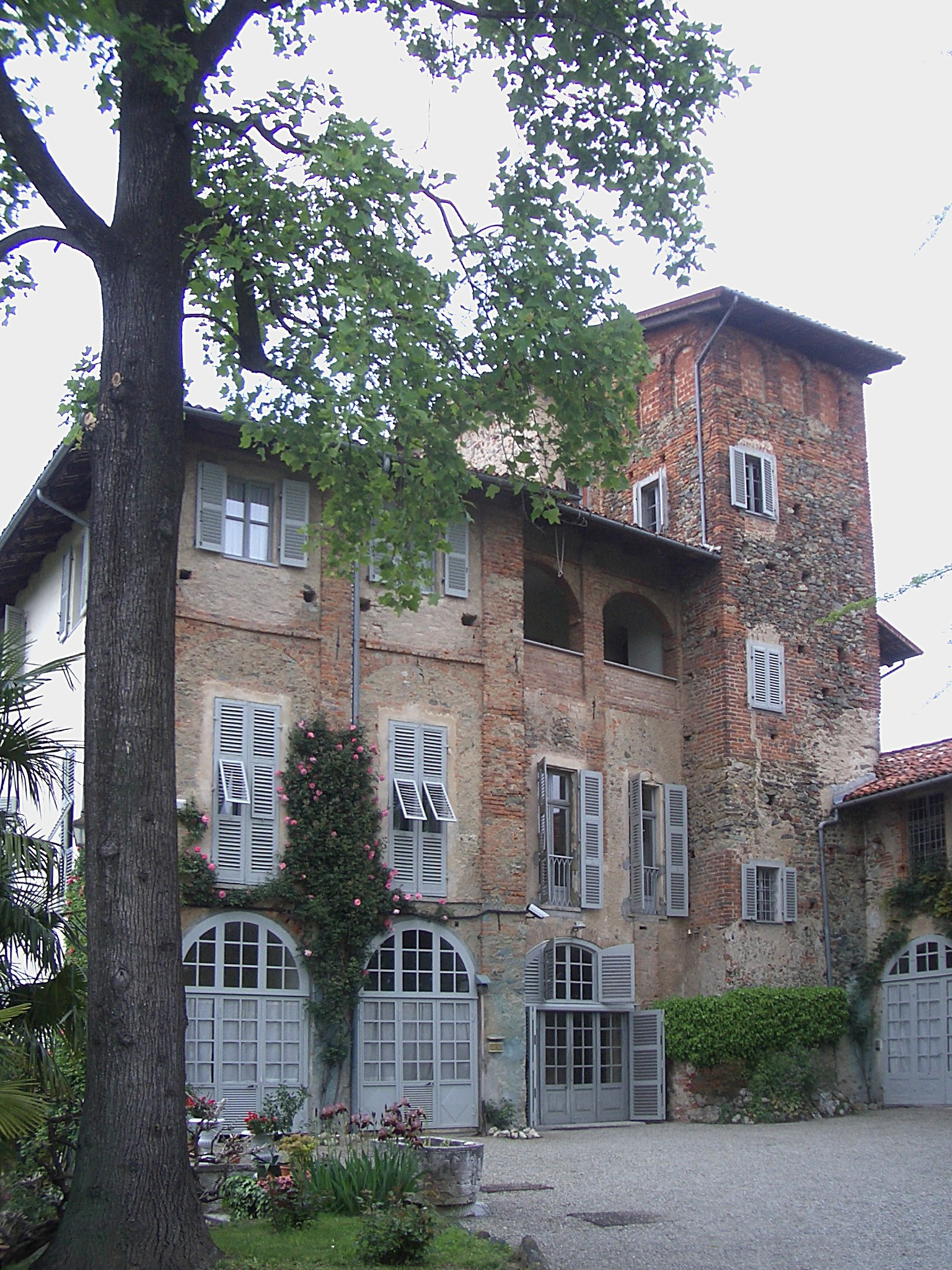
- Torre Canavese Castle in 2008

Site information
- Type: Castle

Location
- Location in Italy
- Coordinates: 45°23′26.52″N 7°45′43.63″E

Torre Canavese Castle (Italian: Castello di Torre Canavese) is a castle located in Torre Canavese, Piedmont, Italy.

== History ==
According to tradition, the castle was founded in 998 by the second son of Arduin of Ivrea, Guidon, who lived there until 1018, the year he was elected Marquess of Ivrea.

Over the centuries, the castle underwent numerous transformations and modernizations, while preserving original elements such as the tower, the walls surrounding the hilltop, and the chapel. In 1968, the Datrino family purchased the property from the Counts Balbo of Vinadio and transformed it into an antique gallery, which hosted significant exhibitions, including Treasures of the Kremlin in 1993 and Gems and Diamonds in 1994.

== Description ==
The castle is located on a hill-top in the center of the village of Torre Canavese.
