= San Martino Canavese =

San Martino Canavese San Martin Canavèis
- Comune
- Comune di San Martino Canavese
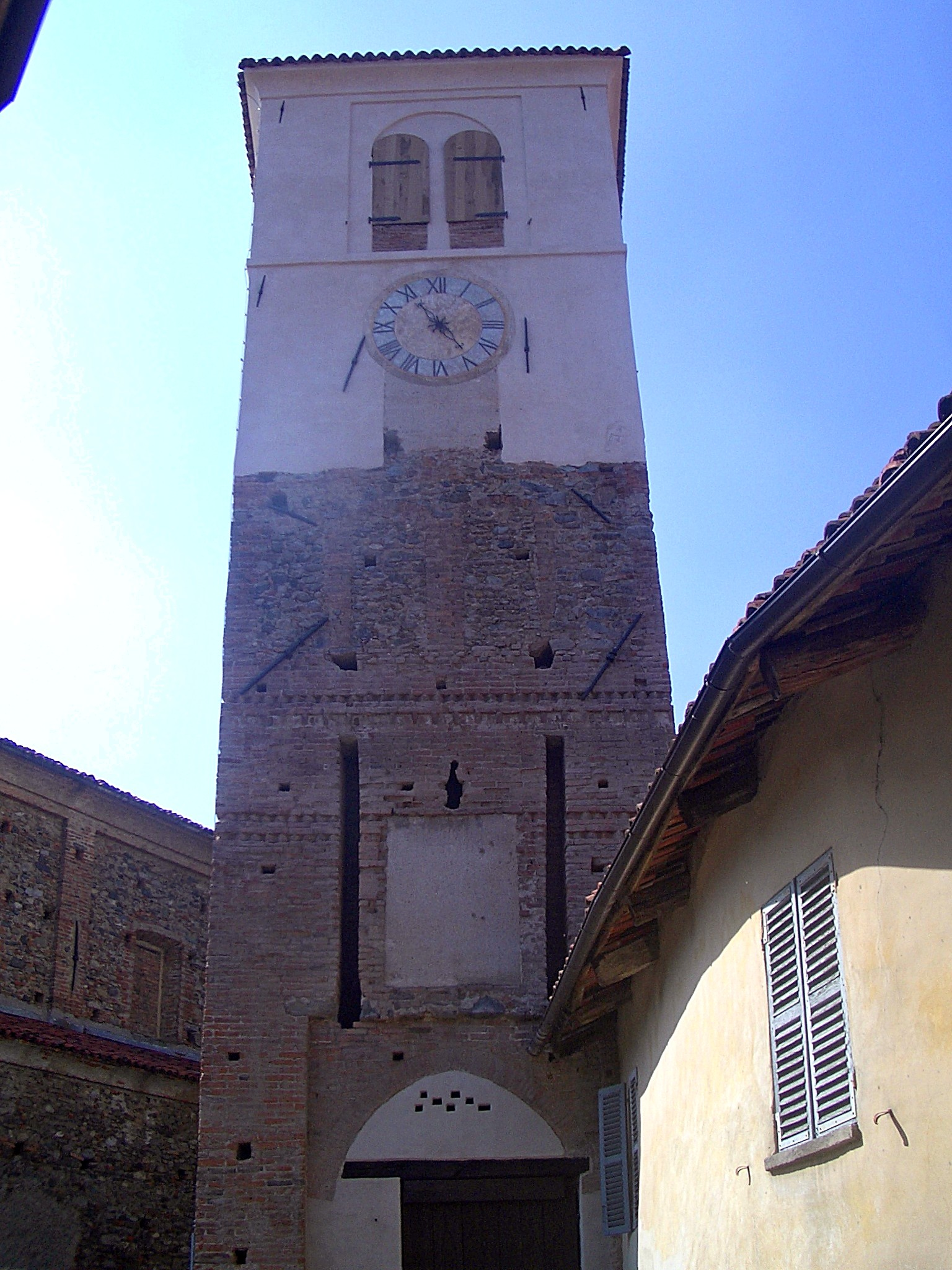
- Gate-Tower of San Martino Canavese.

- Location within Italy Location within Piedmont
- Coordinates: 45°24′N 7°49′E
- Country: Italy
- Region: Piedmont
- Metropolitan city: Turin (TO)

Government
  - Mayor: Richard vallo

Area
  - Total: 9.8 km^{2} (3.8 sq mi)
- Elevation: 385 m (1,263 ft)

Population (31 December 2010)
  - Total: 865
  - Density: 88/km^{2} (230/sq mi)
- Demonym: Sammartinesi
- Time zone: UTC+1 (CET)
  - Summer (DST): UTC+2 (CEST)
- Postal code: 10010
- Dialing code: 0125

San Martino Canavese (Piedmontese: San Martin Canavèis) is a comune (municipality) in the Metropolitan City of Turin in the Italian region Piedmont, located about 40 kilometres (25 mi) north of Turin.

San Martino Canavese borders the following municipalities: Castellamonte, Pavone Canavese, Colleretto Giacosa, Parella, Perosa Canavese, Torre Canavese, Scarmagno, Agliè, and Vialfrè.
