= Agliè =

Agliè Ajé (Piedmontese)
- Comune
- Comune di Agliè
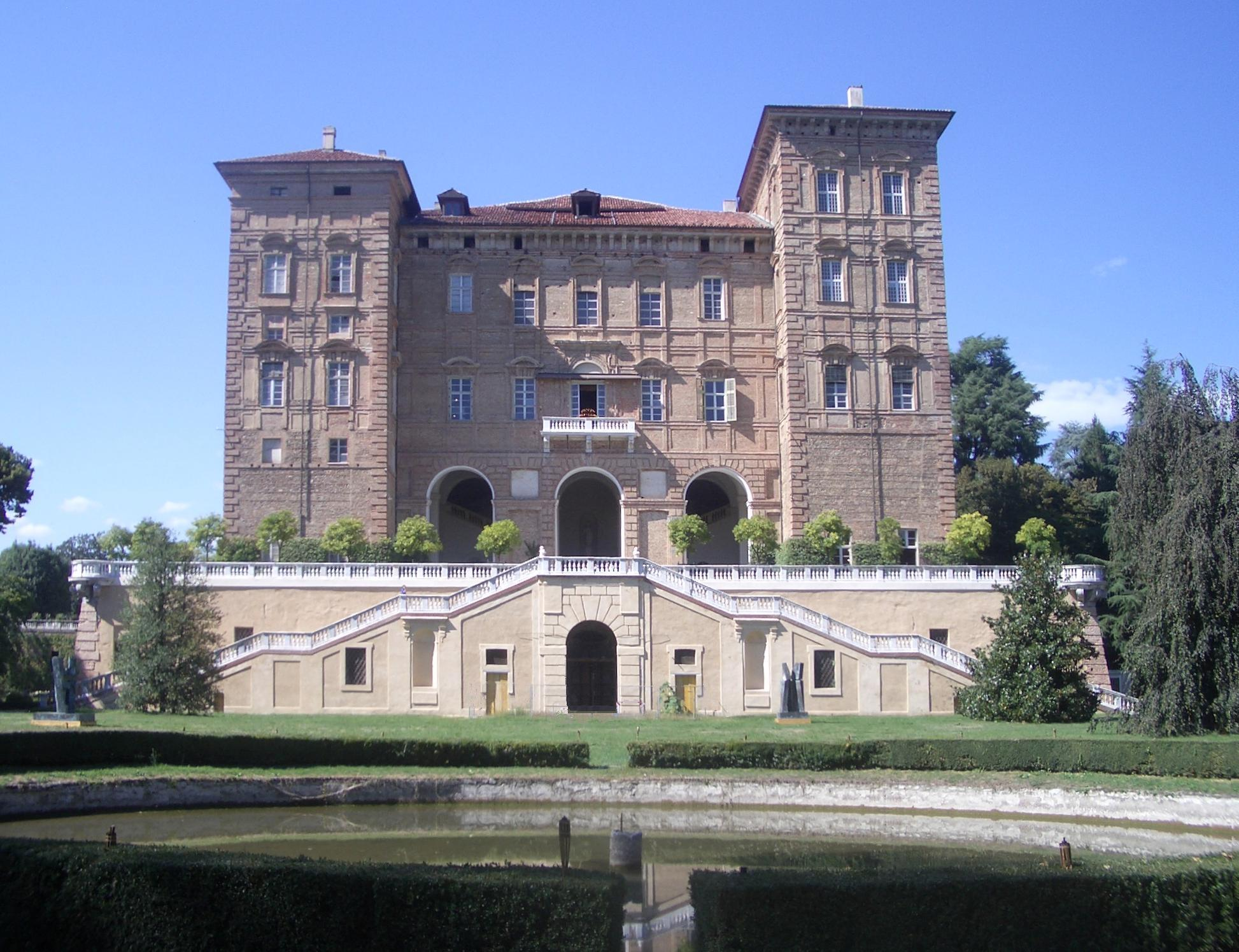
- The Castle of Agliè, one of the residences of the Royal House of Savoy

- Coat of arms

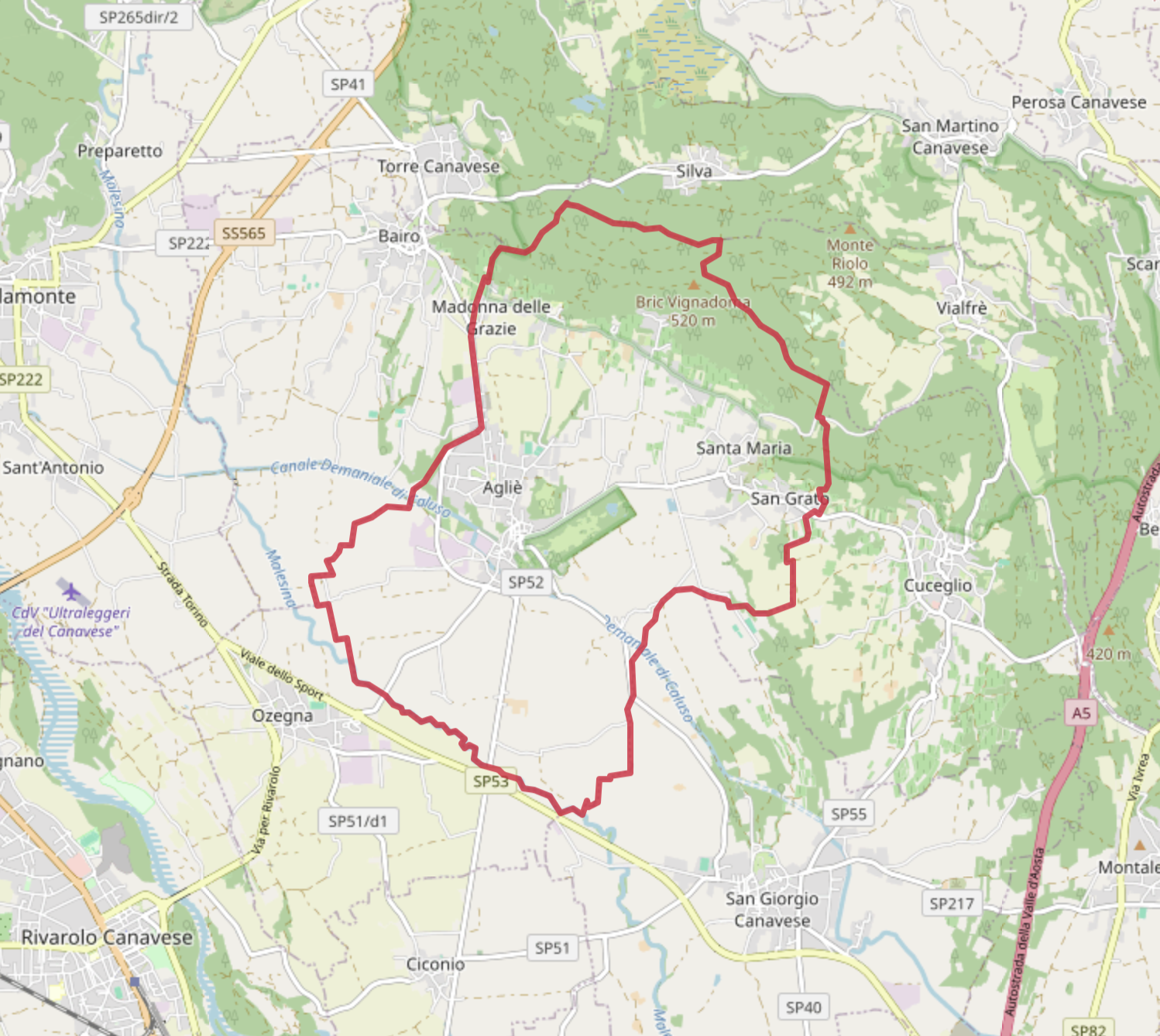

- Location of Agliè in Italy Agliè (Piedmont)
- Coordinates: 45°22′N 7°46′E
- Country: Italy
- Region: Piedmont
- Metropolitan city: Turin (TO)
- Frazioni: Cascine Bernardini, Cascine Luisetta, Cascine Malesina, Cascine Oberto, Cascine Ricco, Cascine Volpatti, Madonna Delle Grazie, Santa Maria-Sangrato, Strada Privata Brunetta

Government
  - Mayor: Marco Succio

Area
  - Total: 13.15 km^{2} (5.08 sq mi)
- Elevation: 315 m (1,033 ft)

Population (30 November 2017)
  - Total: 2,635
  - Density: 200.4/km^{2} (519.0/sq mi)
- Demonym: Alladiese(i)
- Time zone: UTC+1 (CET)
  - Summer (DST): UTC+2 (CEST)
- Postal code: 10011
- Dialing code: 0124
- Patron saint: St. Massimo of Riez
- Saint day: First Sunday in July
- Website: Official website

Agliè (Piedmontese: Ajé) is a comune (municipality) in the Metropolitan City of Turin in the Italian region Piedmont, located about 35 kilometres (22 mi) north of Turin.

Agliè borders the following municipalities: San Martino Canavese, Torre Canavese, Bairo, Vialfrè, Cuceglio, San Giorgio Canavese, and Ozegna.

== Main sights ==
=== Castello Ducale ===
Agliè's main attraction is its Castello Ducale, one of the Residences of the Royal House of Savoy, listed in the UNESCO World Heritage Sites. Dating from the 12th century, it was originally a possession of the counts of San Martino. In the 17th century, it was turned into a rich residence by count Filippo d'Agliè, but was ravaged during the French invasion of 1706.

In 1765 it was acquired by Charles Emmanuel III of Savoy and sold to his son Benedetto of Savoy who had it radically renewed ten years later, under design by Ignazio Birago di Bòrgaro. Thenceforth it was a summer residence for the Kings of Sardinia. It was sold to the Italian state in 1939.

It has a monumental façade with two stairs and a fountain; the interior includes 300 rooms, mostly provided with contemporary furniture. The castle is surrounded by large English- and Italian-style gardens. It was used as the location for the Italian series Elisa di Rivombrosa as Rivombrosa.

Other sights include:

- Church of Santa Marta, an example of Baroque architecture by Costanzo Michela
- Parrocchiale di San Massimo, annexed to the castle
- Villa Meleto, a 19th-century countryside residence used by the poet Guido Gozzano
- Church of San Gaudenzio, where Gozzano is buried.
