= Bairo =

- Comune
- Comune di Bairo
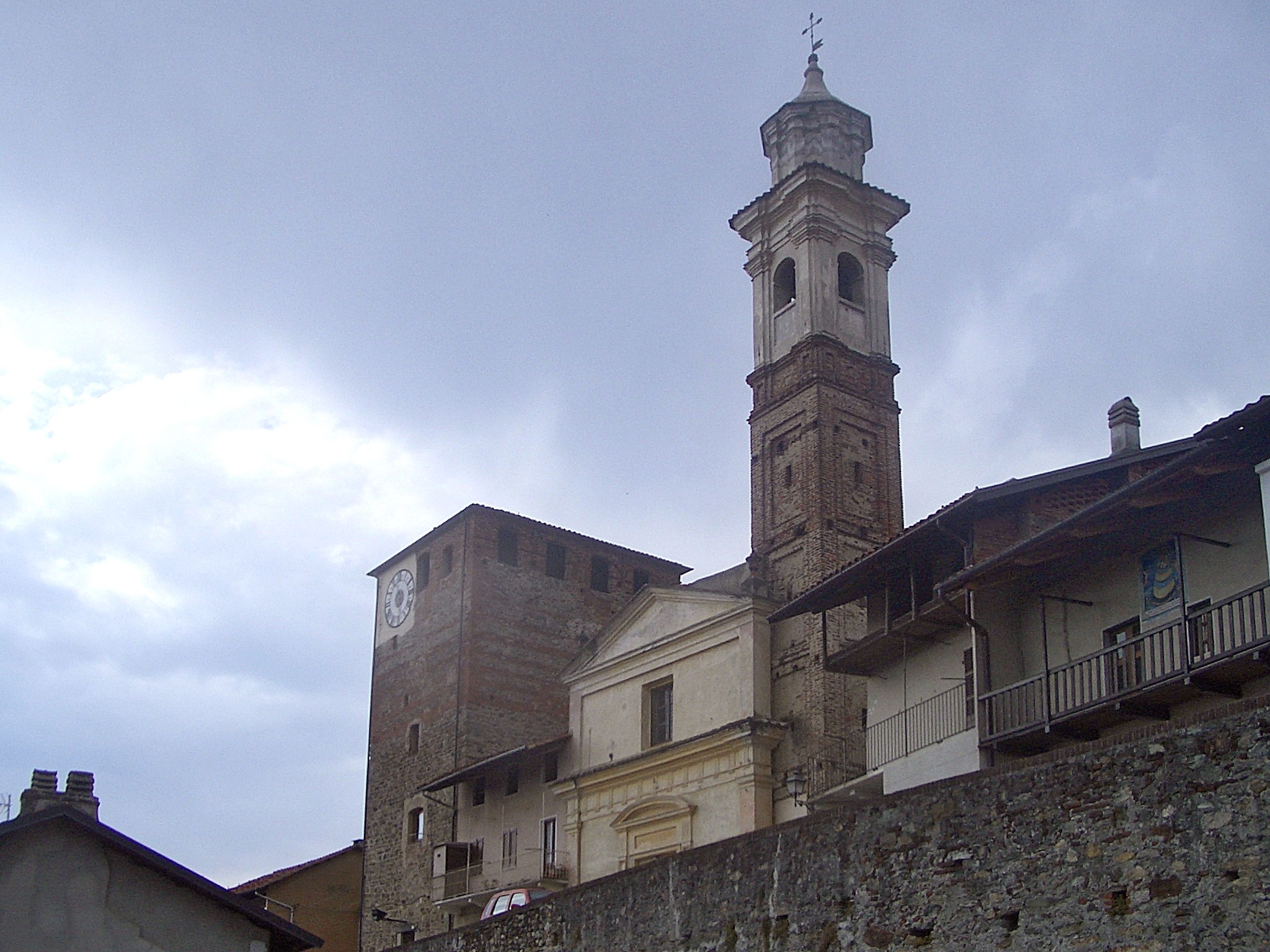

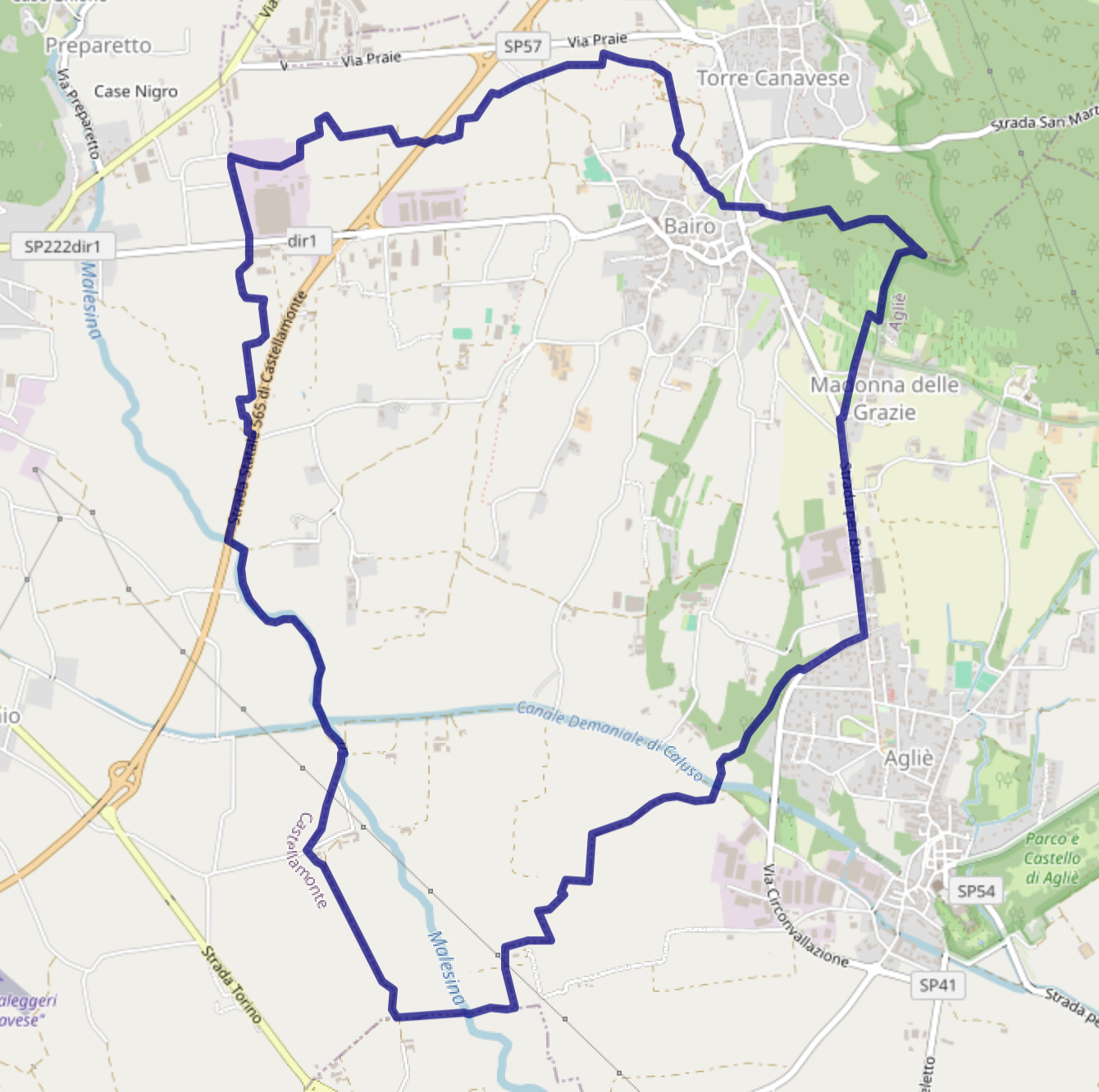
- OSM map of Bairo

- Location within Italy Location within Piedmont
- Coordinates: 45°23′N 7°45′E
- Country: Italy
- Region: Piedmont
- Metropolitan city: Turin (TO)

Government
  - Mayor: Claudio Succio

Area
  - Total: 7.09 km^{2} (2.74 sq mi)
- Elevation: 360 m (1,180 ft)

Population (1-1-2017)
  - Total: 800
  - Density: 110/km^{2} (290/sq mi)
- Demonym: Bairese(i)
- Time zone: UTC+1 (CET)
  - Summer (DST): UTC+2 (CEST)
- Postal code: 10010
- Dialing code: 0124

Bairo is a comune (municipality) in the Metropolitan City of Turin in the Italian region of Piedmont, about 35 kilometres (22 mi) north of Turin.

Bairo borders the following municipalities: Castellamonte, Torre Canavese, Agliè, and Ozegna.
