= Perosa =

Perosa may refer to:

- Perosa Argentina, comune in the Metropolitan City of Turin in the Italian region Piedmont
- Perosa Canavese, comune in the Metropolitan City of Turin in the Italian region Piedmont

== See also ==
- Villar-Perosa (disambiguation)
