= Cuceglio =

- Comune
- Comune di Cuceglio
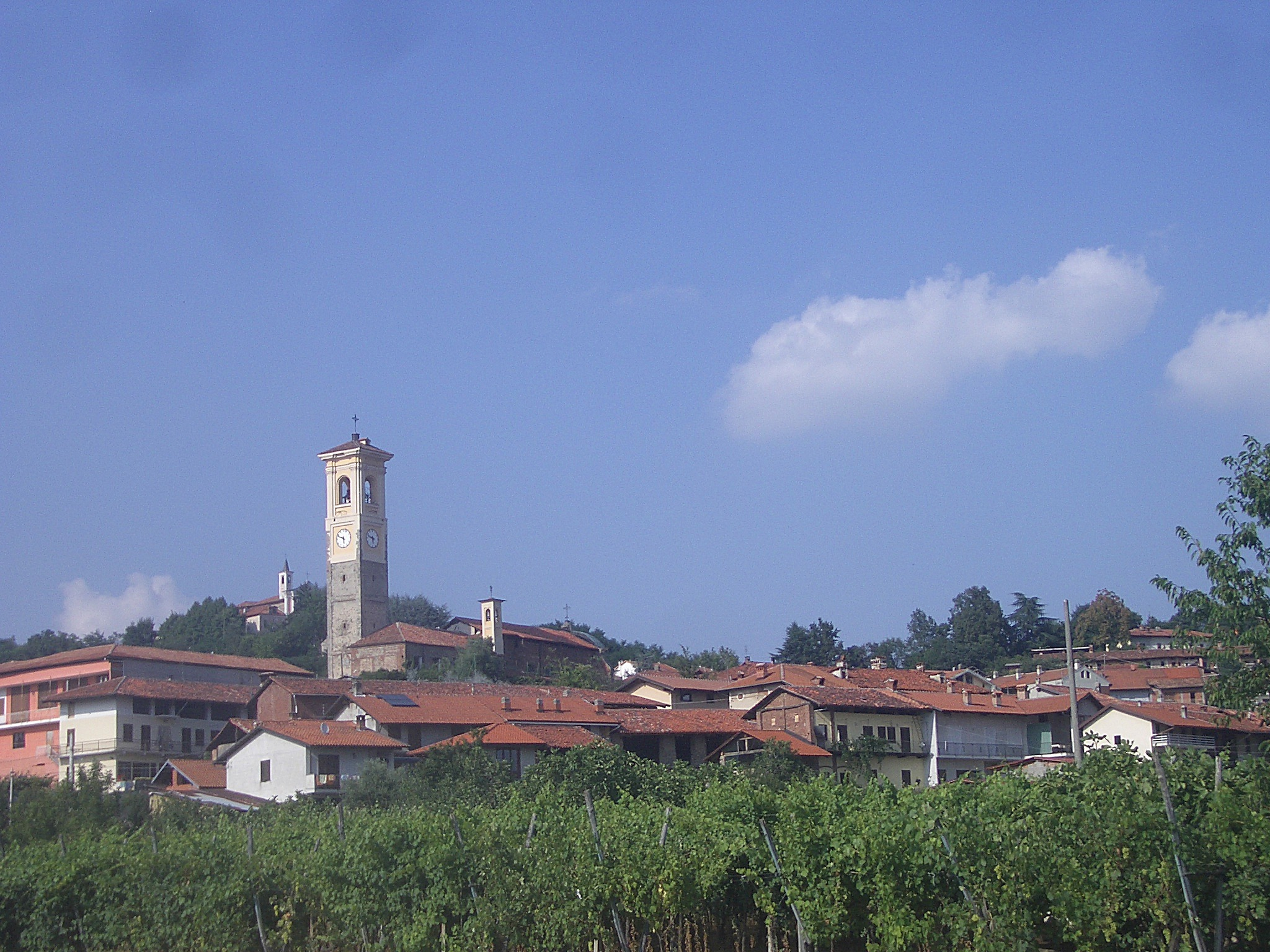
- Veduta del paese

- Coat of arms

- Location within Italy Location within Piedmont
- Coordinates: 45°22′N 7°49′E
- Country: Italy
- Region: Piedmont
- Metropolitan city: Turin (TO)
- Frazioni: Cascine Cuffia

Government
  - Mayor: Sergio Pilotto

Area
  - Total: 6.87 km^{2} (2.65 sq mi)
- Elevation average altitude: 366 m (1,201 ft)

Population (31 Dec 2018)Bilancio demografico Istat
  - Total: 989
  - Density: 144/km^{2} (373/sq mi)
- Demonym: Cucegliesi
- Time zone: UTC+1 (CET)
  - Summer (DST): UTC+2 (CEST)
- Postal code: 10090
- Dialing code: 0124
- Website: Official website

Cuceglio (Cusele in Piedmontese language) is a comune (municipality) in the Metropolitan City of Turin in the Italian region Piedmont, located about 35 kilometres (22 mi) northeast of Turin.

== Monuments and places of interest ==
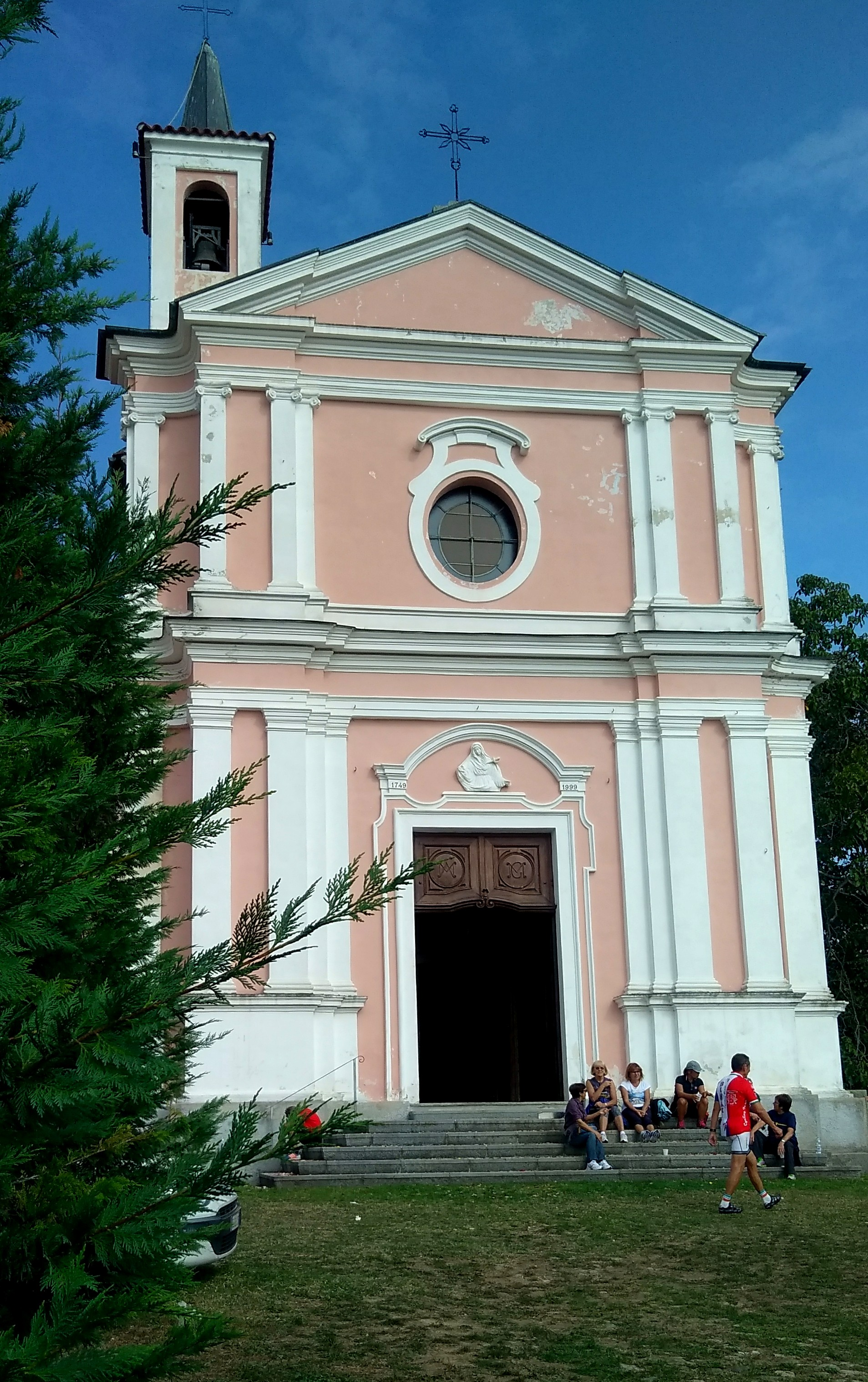
Il Santuario della Beata Vergine Addolorata

In Piazza Guglielmo Marconi, the central square, there is the first Italian monument erected in honor of the king Umberto I of Italy and immediately behind an oak planted in honor of the queen.

The village is divided into two districts, the "Gui" and the "Riva" and a fraction, the "Cascine Cuffia". The latter are detached from the village and are at the bottom towards the plain, the "Gui" is the lower part of the real village and the "Riva" the highest part and includes the Sanctuary of the Beata Vergine Addolorata (Cuceglio), built between the 1747 and the 1758. From there is visible most of the flat land of "canavese", up to Turin.

== Society ==
=== Demographic evolution ===
Historical population

Year	Pop.	±%
1861	1,248	—
1871	1,187	−4.9%
1881	1,144	−3.6%
1901	1,335	+16.7%
1911	1,482	+11.0%
1921	1,242	−16.2%
1931	918	−26.1%
1936	918	+0.0%

Year	Pop.	±%
1951	750	−18.3%
1961	688	−8.3%
1971	774	+12.5%
1981	771	−0.4%
1991	843	+9.3%
2001	925	+9.7%
2011	997	+7.8%

Source: Italian National Institute for Statistics registered population

=== Ethnicities and foreign minorities ===
As reported from the Istat there are 81 foreigners (38 males and 41 females) resident in Cuceglio, at 1 January 2011.

== Economy ==
For centuries in these morainic hills the main activity has been viticulture, then the cultivation of the vine up to the production of wine. Many wines are produced in Cuceglio, but certainly the most precious and characteristic is Erbaluce, from the name of homonymous vine. In Cuceglio there is the Cantina Sociale of the Canavese area and the Cantina Roletto.

Cuceglio borders the following municipalities: Scarmagno, Agliè, Vialfrè, Mercenasco, San Giorgio Canavese, and Montalenghe.
