= Perosa Canavese =

- Comune
- Comune di Perosa Canavese
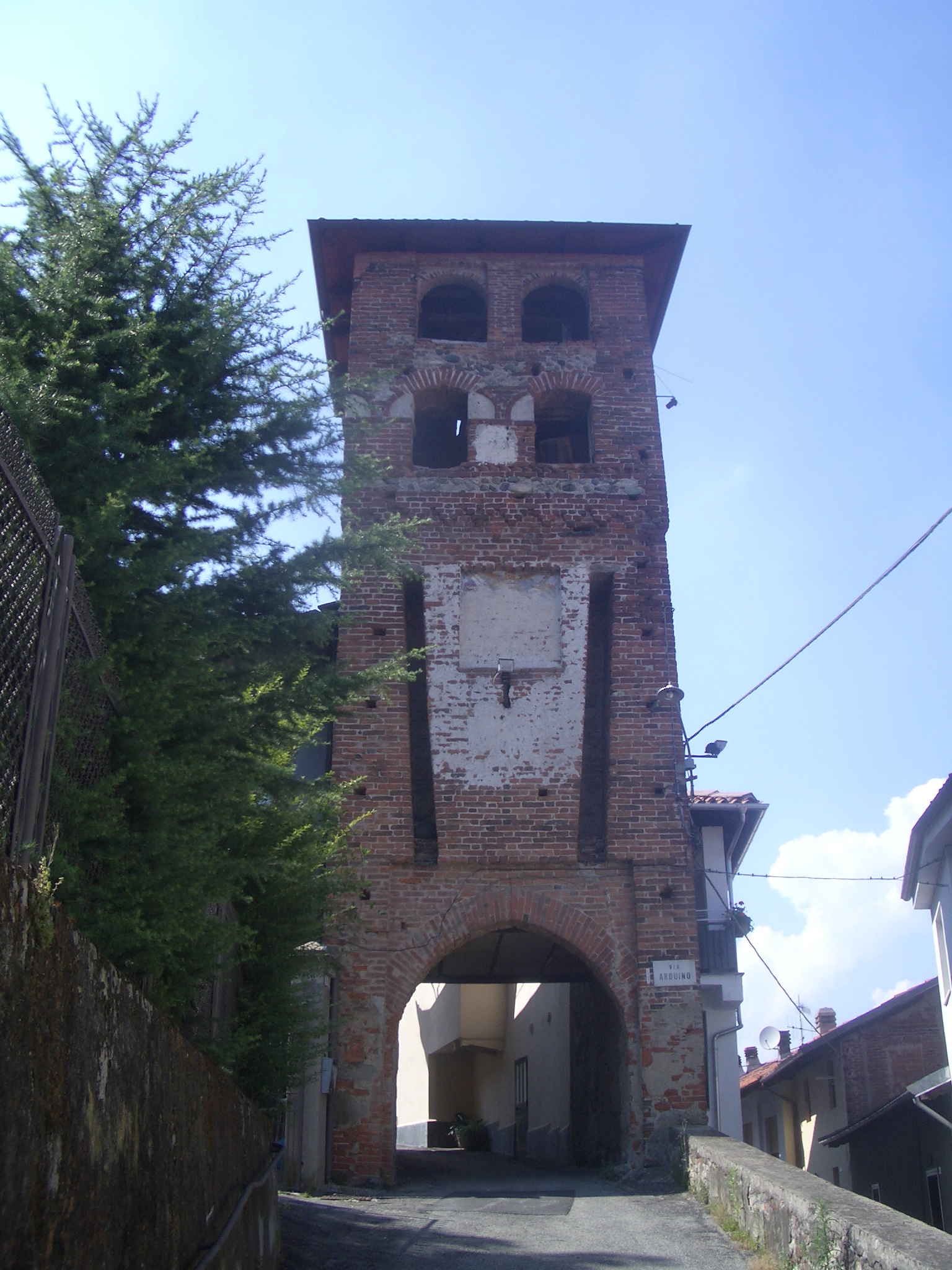

- Location within Italy Location within Piedmont
- Coordinates: 45°24′N 7°50′E
- Country: Italy
- Region: Piedmont
- Metropolitan city: Turin (TO)

Government
  - Mayor: Michele Borgia

Area
  - Total: 5.0 km^{2} (1.9 sq mi)
- Elevation: 265 m (869 ft)

Population (31 December 2010)
  - Total: 578
  - Density: 120/km^{2} (300/sq mi)
- Demonym: Perosiesi
- Time zone: UTC+1 (CET)
  - Summer (DST): UTC+2 (CEST)
- Dialing code: 0125
- Website: Official website

Perosa Canavese (Piedmontese: Prosa) is a comune (municipality) in the Metropolitan City of Turin in the Italian region Piedmont, located about 40 km northeast of Turin.

Perosa Canavese borders the following municipalities: Pavone Canavese, Romano Canavese, San Martino Canavese, and Scarmagno.
