= Ozegna Castle =

Castle in Ozegna, Piedmont, Italy

- Castello di Ozegna
- Ozegna, Piedmont, Italy
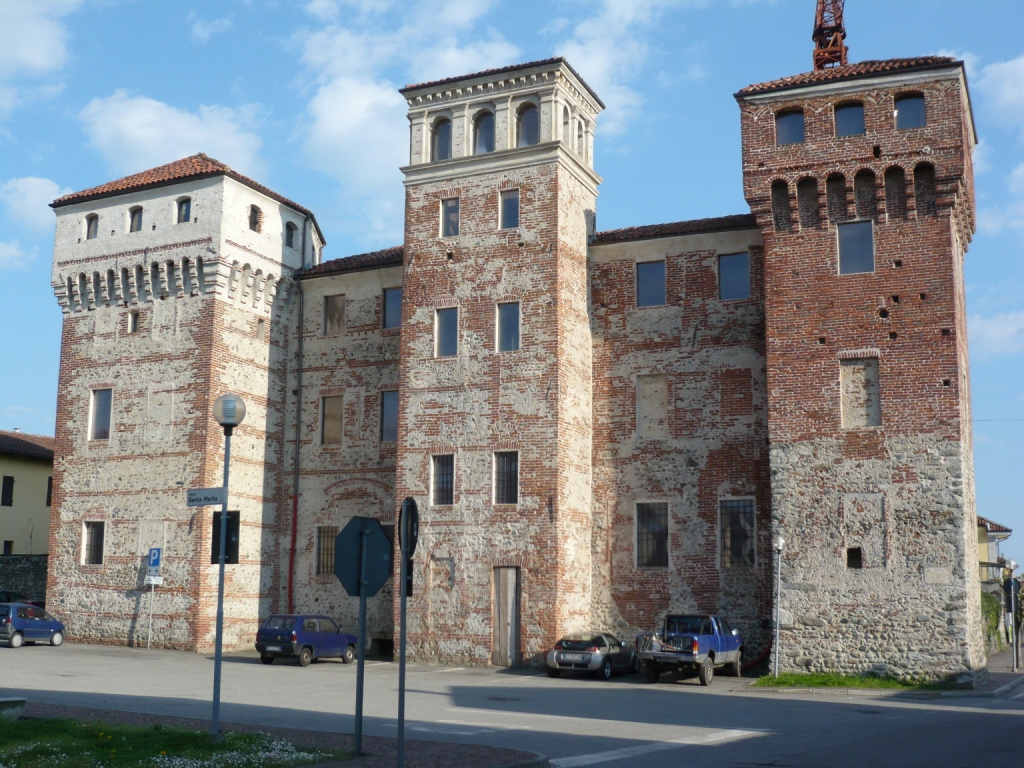
- Ozegna Castle in 2009

Site information
- Type: Castle

Location
- Location in Italy
- Coordinates: 45°21′00.79″N 7°44′29.56″E

Ozegna Castle (Italian: Castello di Ozegna) is a castle located in Ozegna, Piedmont, Italy.

== History ==
The castle is first mentioned in 1363 by Pietro Avario in his De Bello Canepiciano. During this period, Ozegna was under the jurisdiction of the Counts of Biandrate di San Giorgio, who governed the area through enfeoffment by the Marquises of Monferrato between 1244 and 1366. The castle was built in the second half of the 14th century. The inhabitants of Ozegna, seeking protection, pledged their loyalty to the Counts of Biandrate, who agreed to their act of devotion on the condition that they construct a fortified structure for the counts' use within the perimeter of the pre-existing ricetto. However, the castle's intended quadrangular design remained incomplete, with the southern and western sides unfinished.

In 1433, the partially built castle fell to Savoyard troops led by Teobaldo d’Avanchy, who later received its fief by the House of Savoy.

== Description ==
The castle features an L-shaped layout with three quadrangular towers on the northern side and a rounded tower on the southern side. Its courtyard is characterized by a Renaissance-style loggia.

== Gallery ==
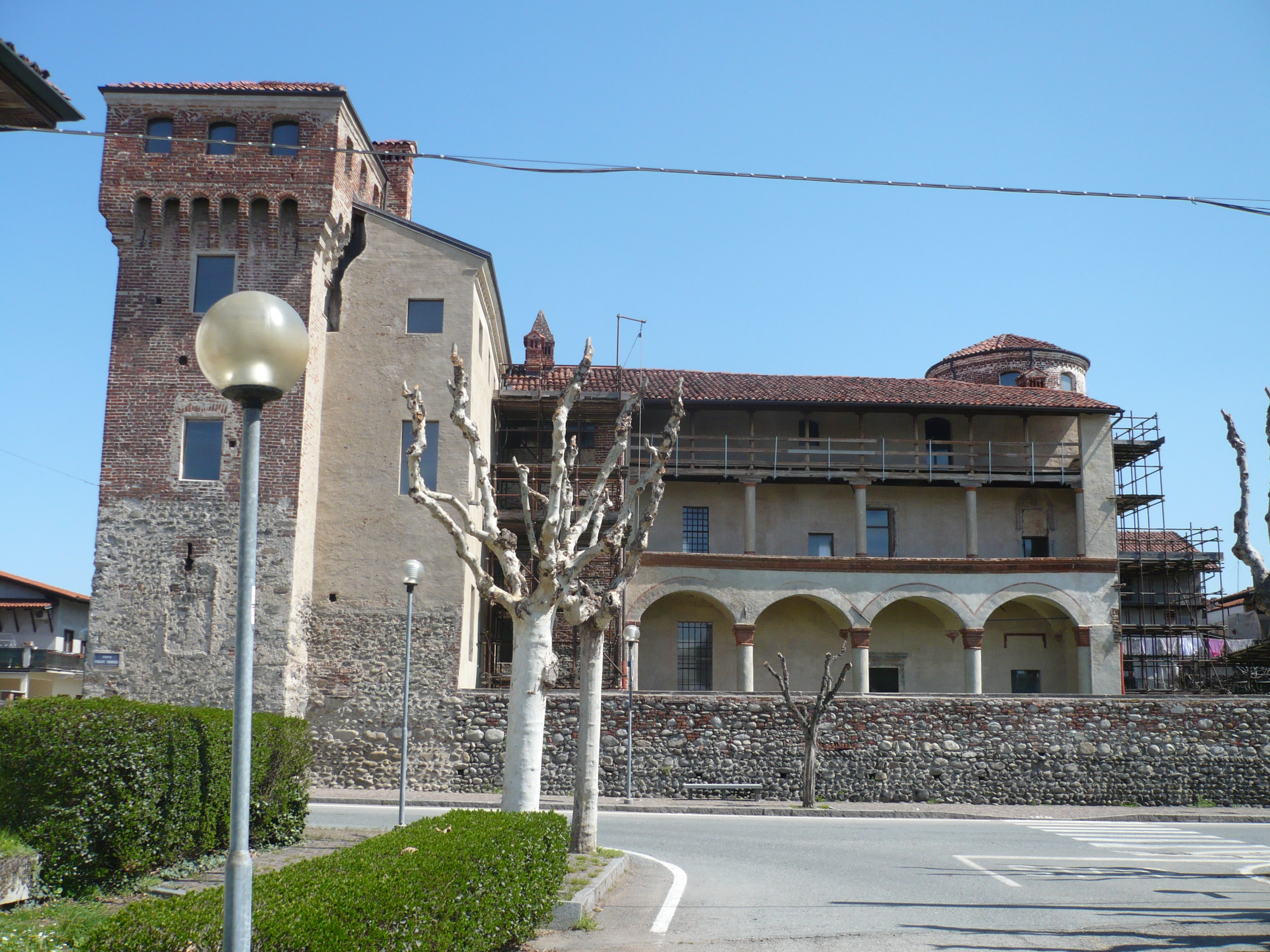

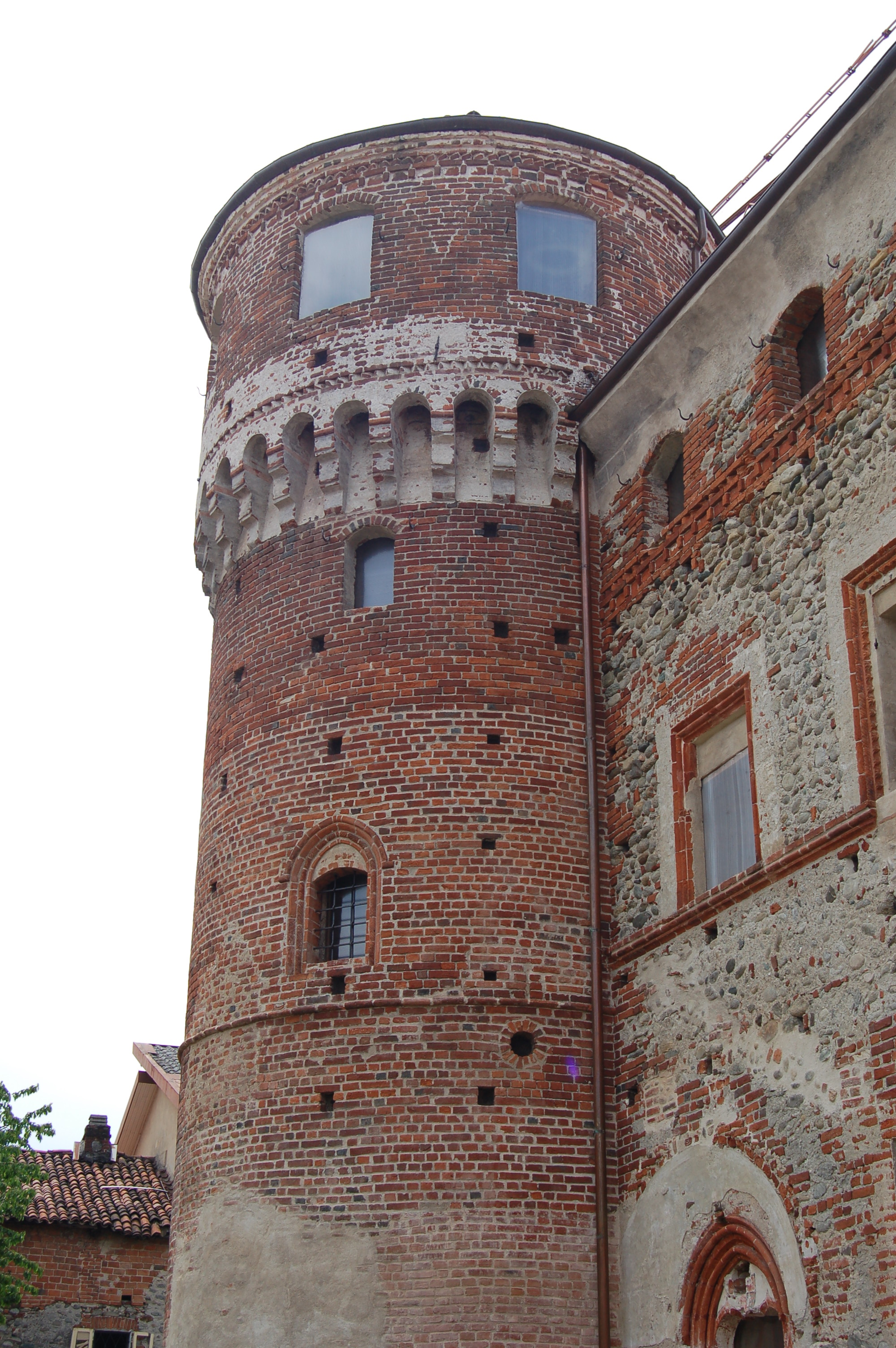

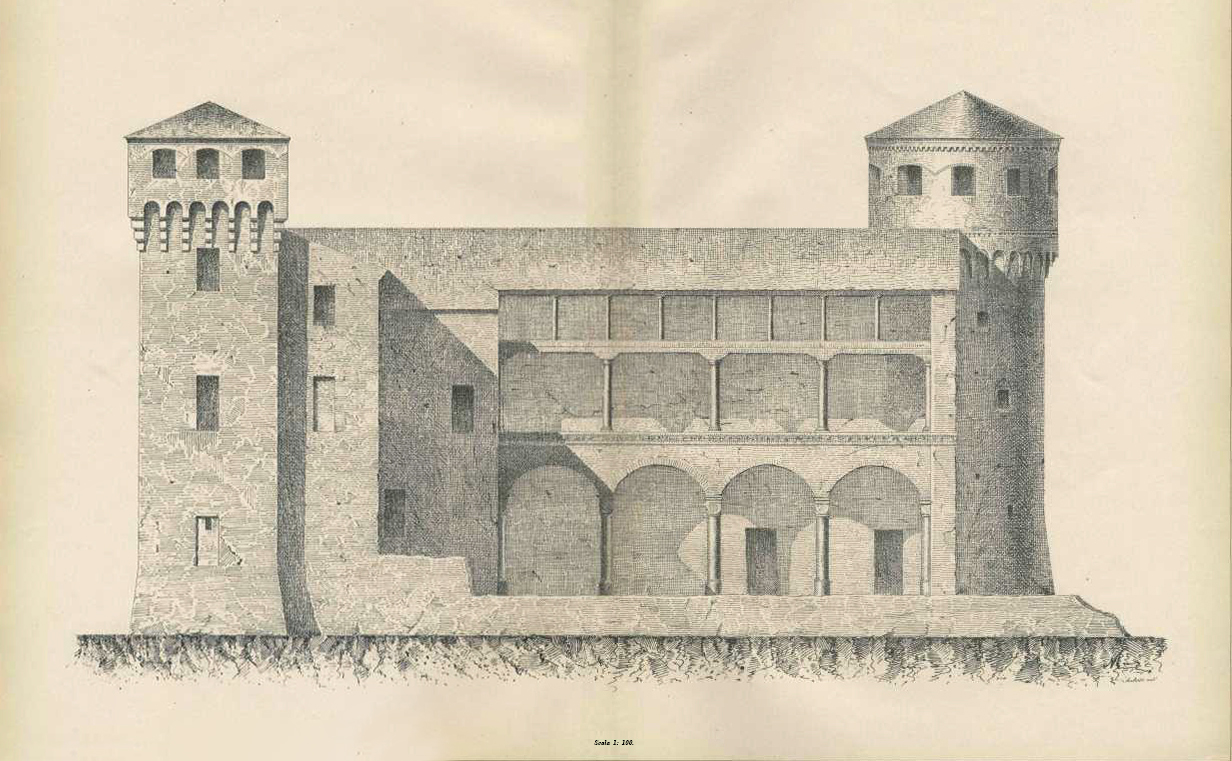
