= Agliè Castle =

- Castello ducale di Agliè
- Agliè, Piedmont, Italy
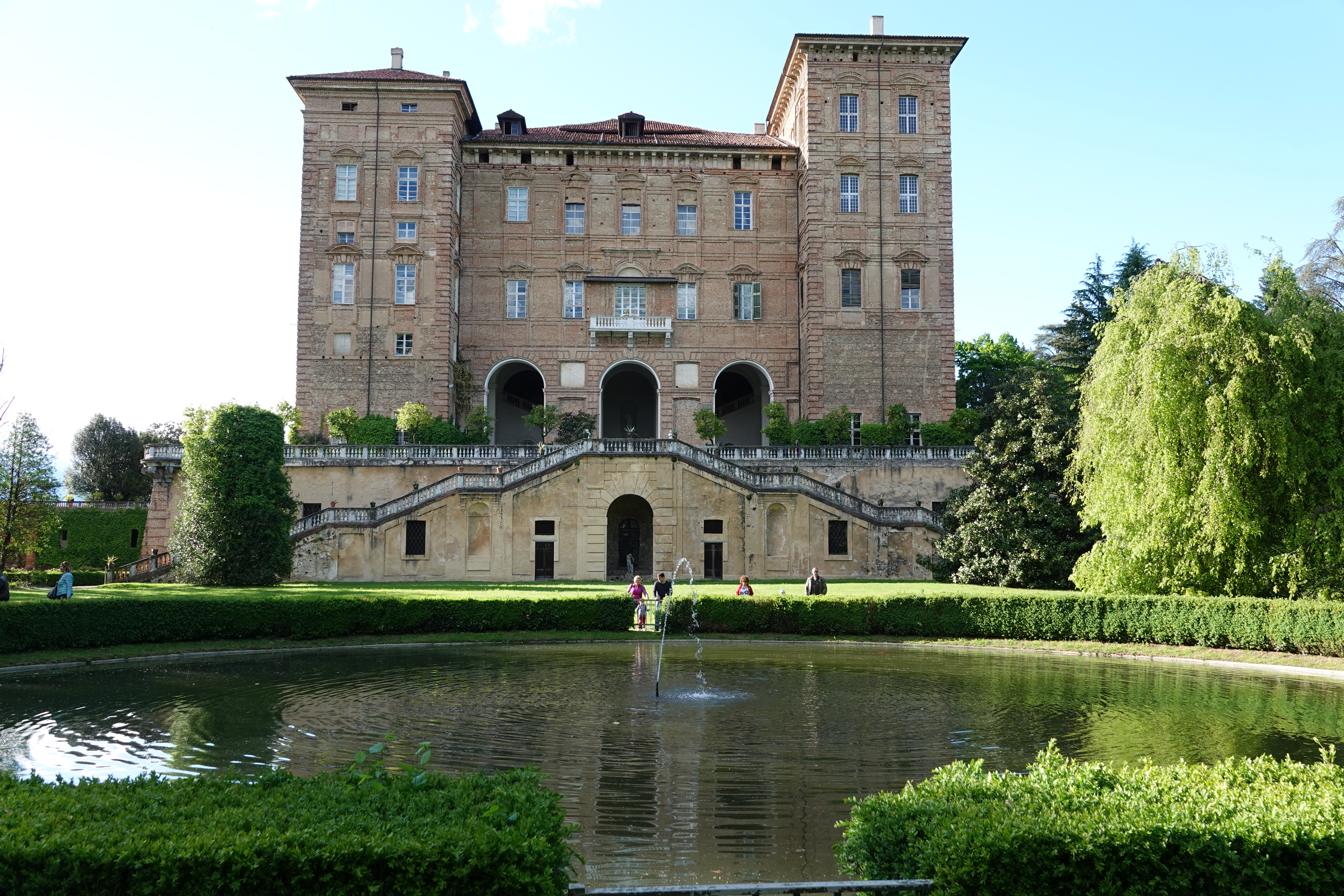
- Agliè Castle in 2019

Site information
- Type: Castle

Location
- Location in Italy
- Location within Italy
- Coordinates: 45°21′41.24″N 7°46′10.42″E

UNESCO World Heritage Site
- Criteria: Architectural: C (i) (ii) (iv) (v)
- Reference: 823bis
- Inscription: 1997 (21st Session)

Agliè Castle (Italian: Castello ducale di Agliè; Piedmontese: Castel ducal d'Ajé) is a castle located in Agliè, Piedmont, Italy.

The castle has been a UNESCO World Heritage Site since 1997 as part of the Residences of the Royal House of Savoy.

== History ==
In the 16th century, the fortress still retained a medieval appearance, featuring a central keep, a courtyard surrounded by rural buildings and a garden, all enclosed by a sturdy defensive wall and a moat. In 1667, Count Filippo of San Martino, who had served as a counselor to the Christine of France, commissioned the royal architect Amedeo di Castellamonte to redesign the garden-facing façade, the complex of the chapel of San Massimo, the two galleries, and the courtyard. Upon his death, the project was interrupted, but the castle already had two courtyards (one internal and one facing the village of Agliè) and an eastern façade with the two towers transformed into small pavilions.

In 1764, the Counts of San Martino sold the property to the House of Savoy. The castle was thus included it among the holdings of Prince Benedetto, Duke of Chablais. The architect Ignazio Renato Birago di Borgaro was entrusted with its renovation, which included the creation of spacious apartments inside and the construction of a parish church to be connected to the castle by a two-story gallery.

In the early 19th century, during Napoleon's occupation, the castle of Agliè was turned into a refuge for the poor, and the surrounding park was sold to private owners and repurposed for agriculture.

Starting in 1823, the building was reinstated among the possessions of the House of Savoy. During the reign of Charles Felix of Sardinia, a significant and costly interior renovation was carried out, along with a complete refurbishment of its furnishings. The renovation was assigned to the architect Michele Borda di Saluzzo.

During the 1830s and 1840s, further works were executed, including the creation of a large lake and a smaller pond which dramatically transformed the Italian-style garden into a romantic landscape under the direction of German architect Xavier Kurten.

The death of Charles Felix's widow, Maria Cristina of Naples and Sicily, in 1849, marked the transfer of the castle to Charles Albert of Sardinia, as Charles Felix and Maria Cristina had no direct heirs. Charles Albert then passed it on to his younger son, Prince Ferdinando, Duke of Genoa.

The Ozegna railway station, opened in 1887 along with the Rivarolo-Castellamonte railway, had a unique feature: a cast-iron canopy and a small "royal" waiting room reserved for the Dukes of Genoa when they wished to visit the castle. The station remained in operation until 1986.

In 1939, the heirs of Prince Tommaso, Duke of Genoa, sold the castle to the Italian state for 8 million lire.

In 1943, the castle was chosen as a place to shelter art and artifacts from Turin's museums, galleries and cathedrals, to prevent them from being damaged or lost during the Second World War.

== Gallery ==
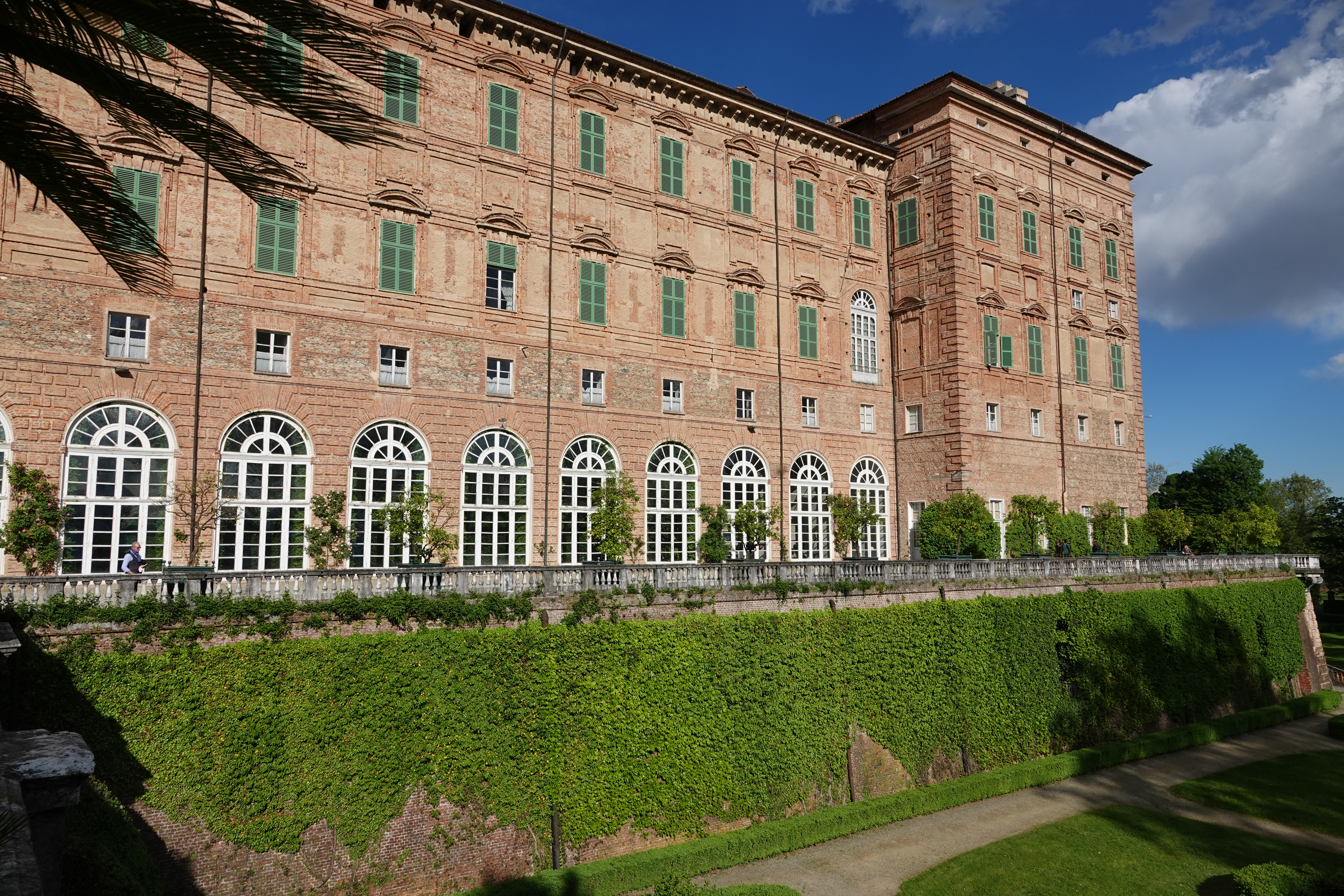

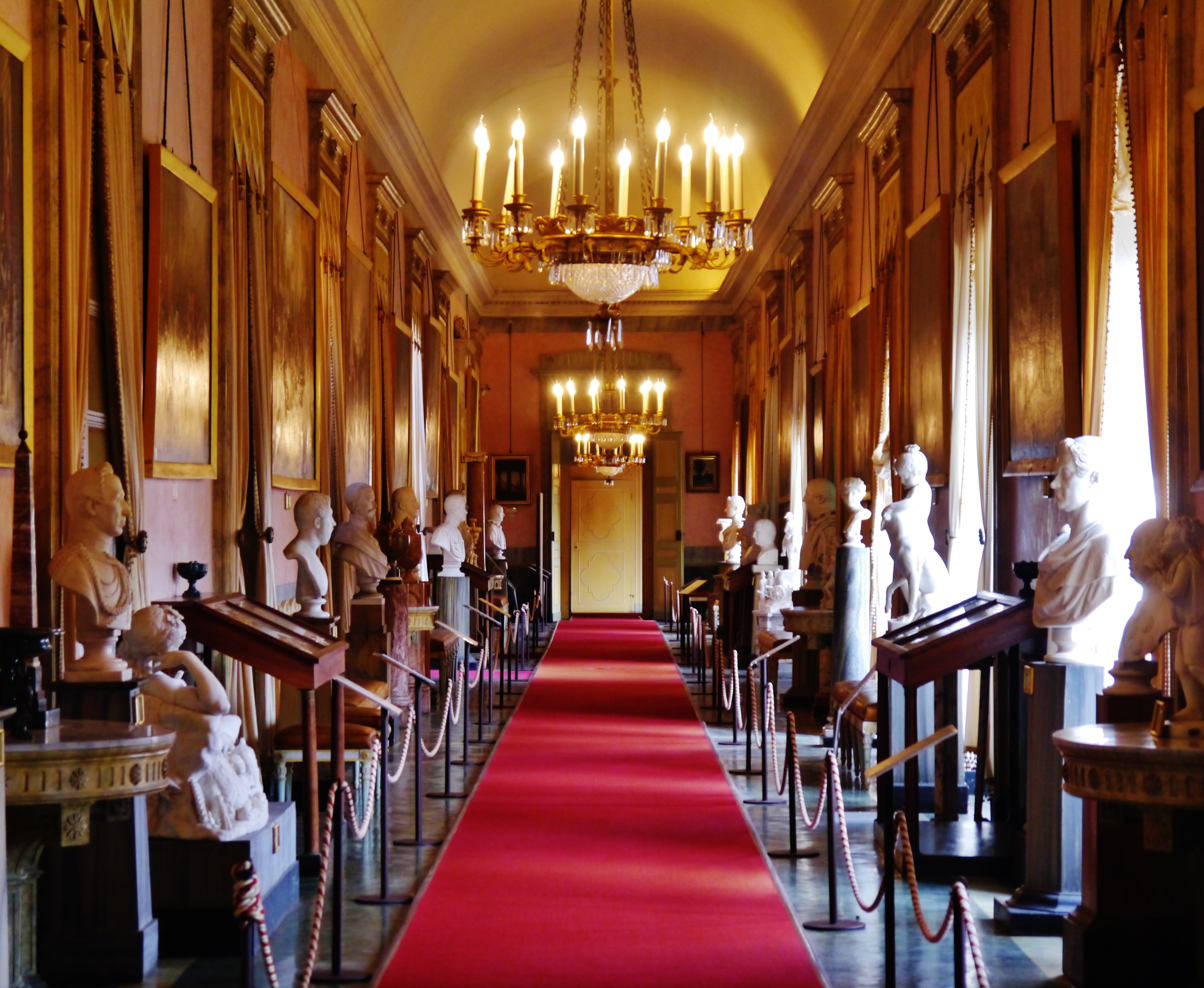

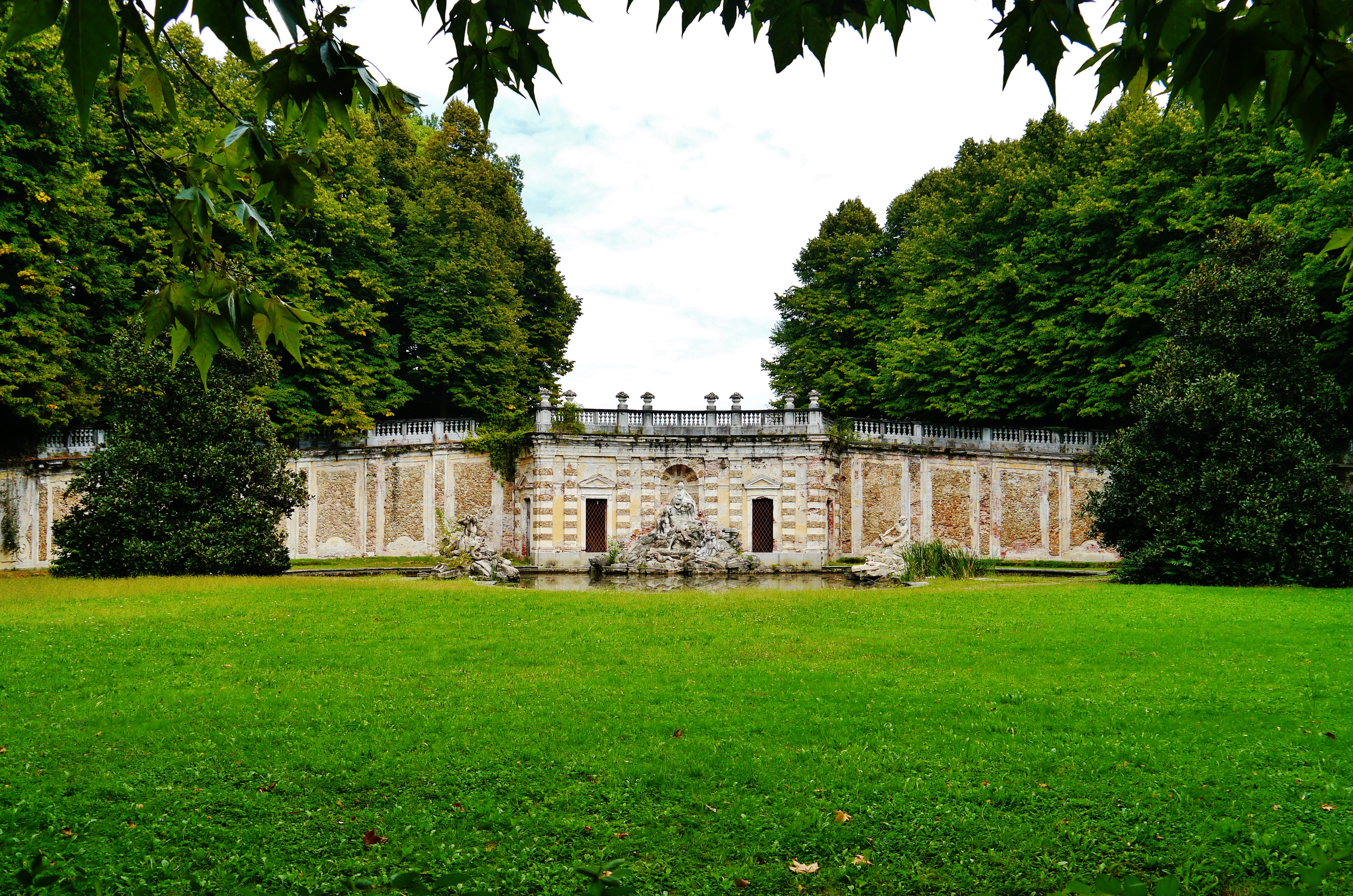
