= Residences of the Royal House of Savoy =

UNESCO World Heritage Site
- Arms of the House of Savoy

- Location within Piedmont Location within Italy
- Location: Piedmont, Italy
- Includes: 1. Zona di Comando – Palazzo Madama – Palazzo Carignano; 2. Castello del Valentino; 3. Villa della Regina; 4. Castello di Moncalieri; 5. Castello di Rivoli; 6. Palazzina di Caccia di Stupinigi; 7. Reggia di Venaria Reale; 8. Borgo castello nel parco della Mandria; 9. Castello di Agliè; 10. Castello di Racconigi; 11. Castello di Govone; 12. Castello di Pollenzo
- Criteria: Cultural: (i), (ii), (iv), (v)
- Reference: 823bis
- Inscription: 1997 (21st Session)
- Extensions: 2010
- Area: 370.82 ha (916.3 acres)
- Buffer zone: 6,931.47 ha (17,128.0 acres)
- Coordinates: 45°04′21″N 7°41′09″E

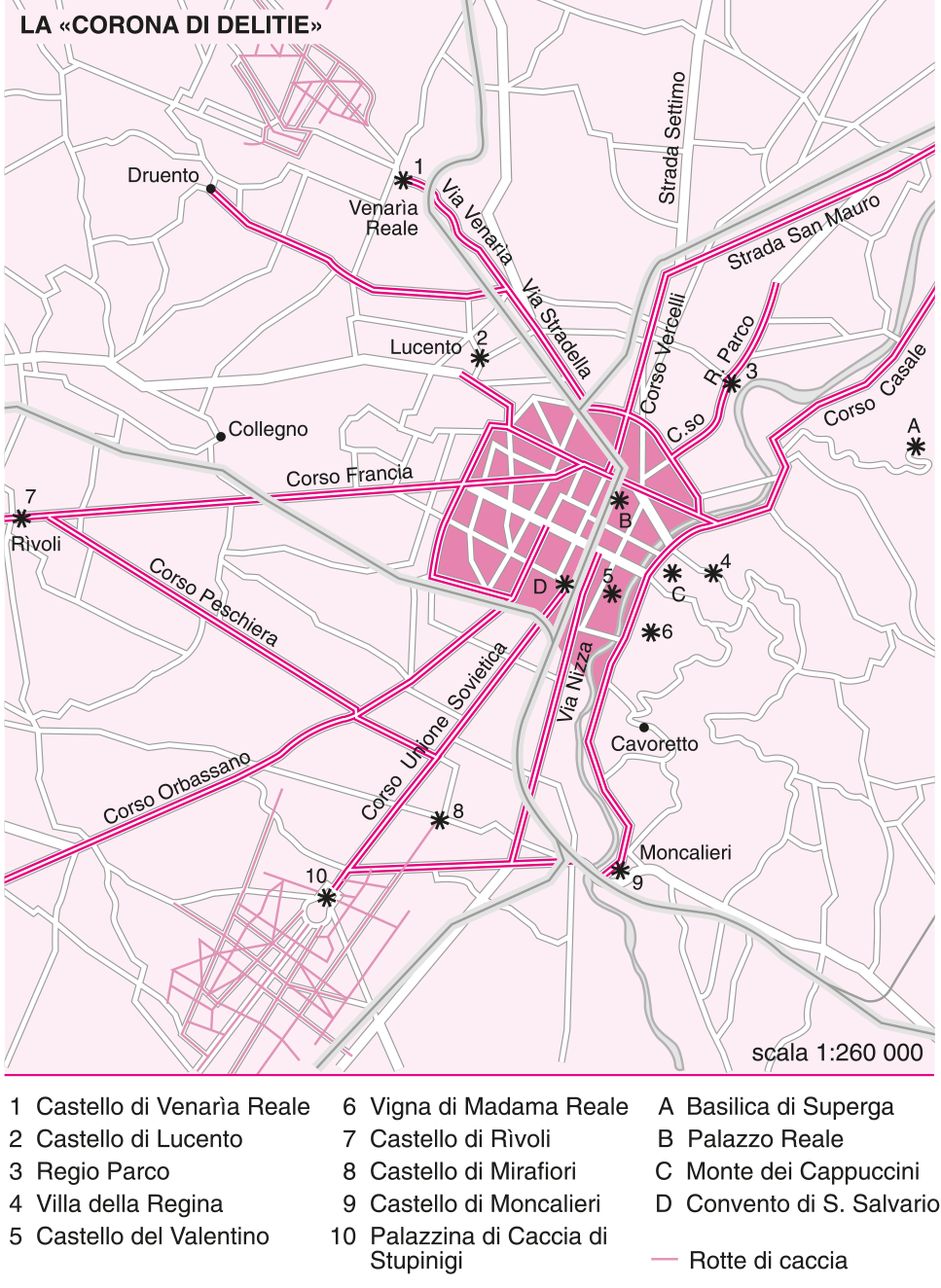
Map of the area

The Residences of the Royal House of Savoy are a group of buildings in Piedmont, northern Italy. It was added to the UNESCO World Heritage Sites list in 1997.

== History ==
The House of Savoy is an ancient royal family, being founded in year 1003 in the Savoy region (now in Rhône-Alpes, France), later expanding so that by 1720 it reigned over the Kingdom of Sardinia in northwestern Italy. Through its junior branch, the House of Savoy-Carignano, it led the unification of Italy in 1861 and ruled the Kingdom of Italy until the aftermath of World War II. In 1946, King Victor Emanuel III abdicated in favor of his son Umberto II, but after an institutional referendum, the monarchy was abolished, a republic was established, and members of the House of Savoy were required to leave the country.

In 1562, Emmanuel Philibert, Duke of Savoy moved his capital to Turin and commenced a series of building projects using the best architects available at the time. The buildings, lavishly constructed and including embellishments by contemporary artists, were designed to impress the public and demonstrate the power of the House of Savoy. As well as palaces in Turin itself, country houses and hunting lodges were built in the surrounding countryside. All these buildings have been jointly listed as a UNESCO World Heritage Site on the basis that they "represent the best in European monumental architecture from the 17th and 18th centuries, expressing in their style and opulence a potent demonstration of the power of absolute monarchy in material terms".

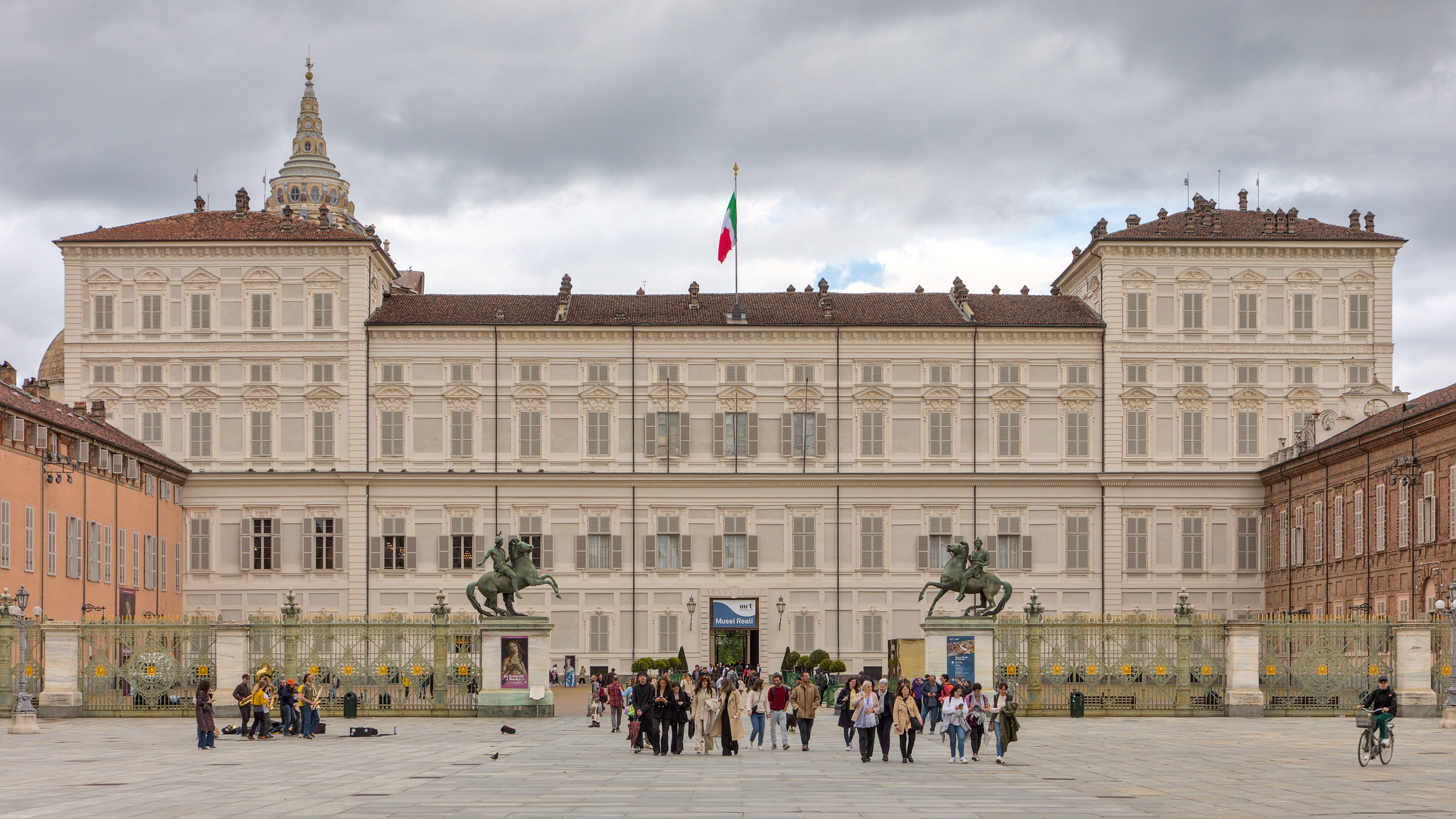
Royal Palace of Turin.

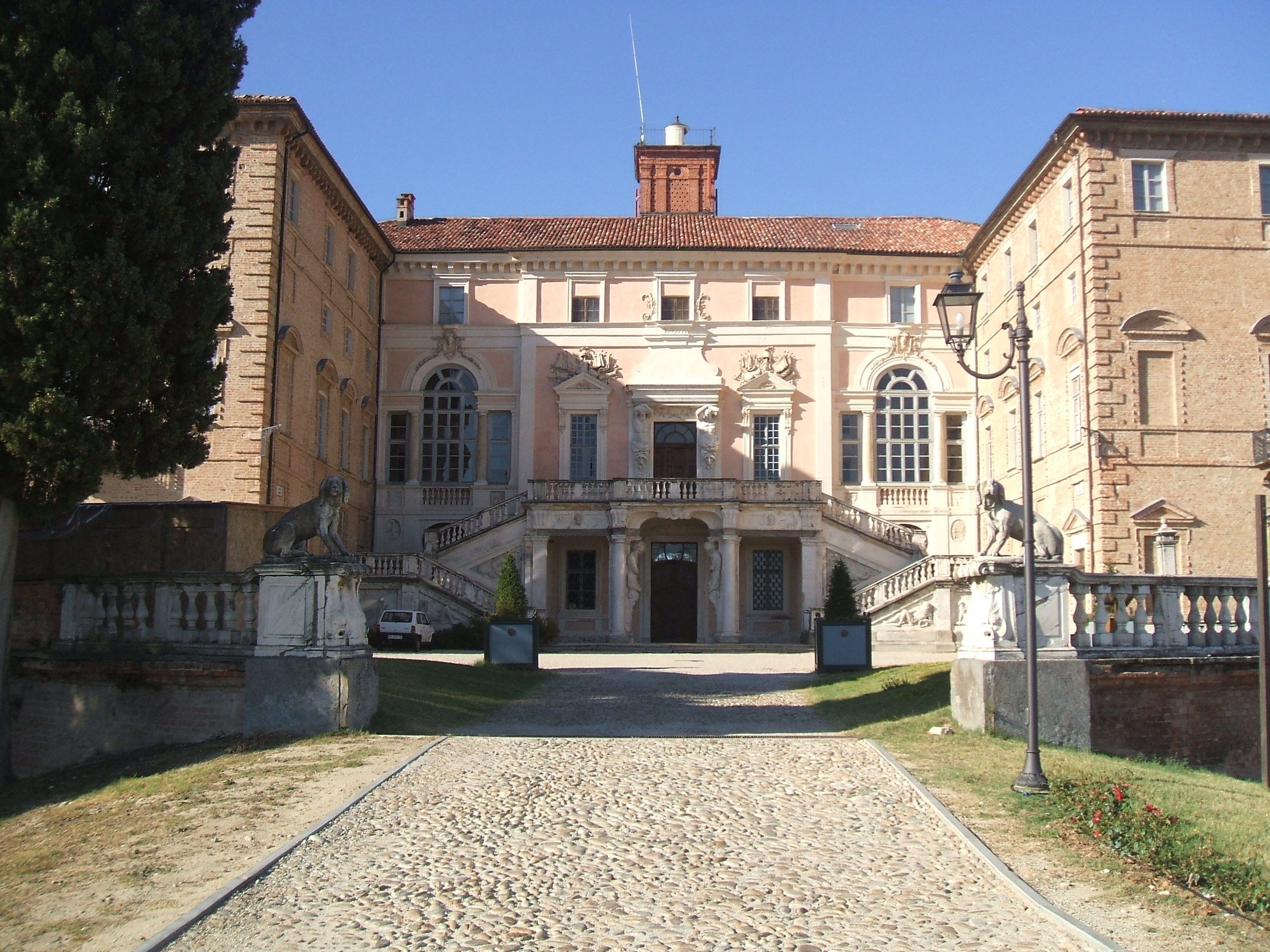
Castle of Govone.

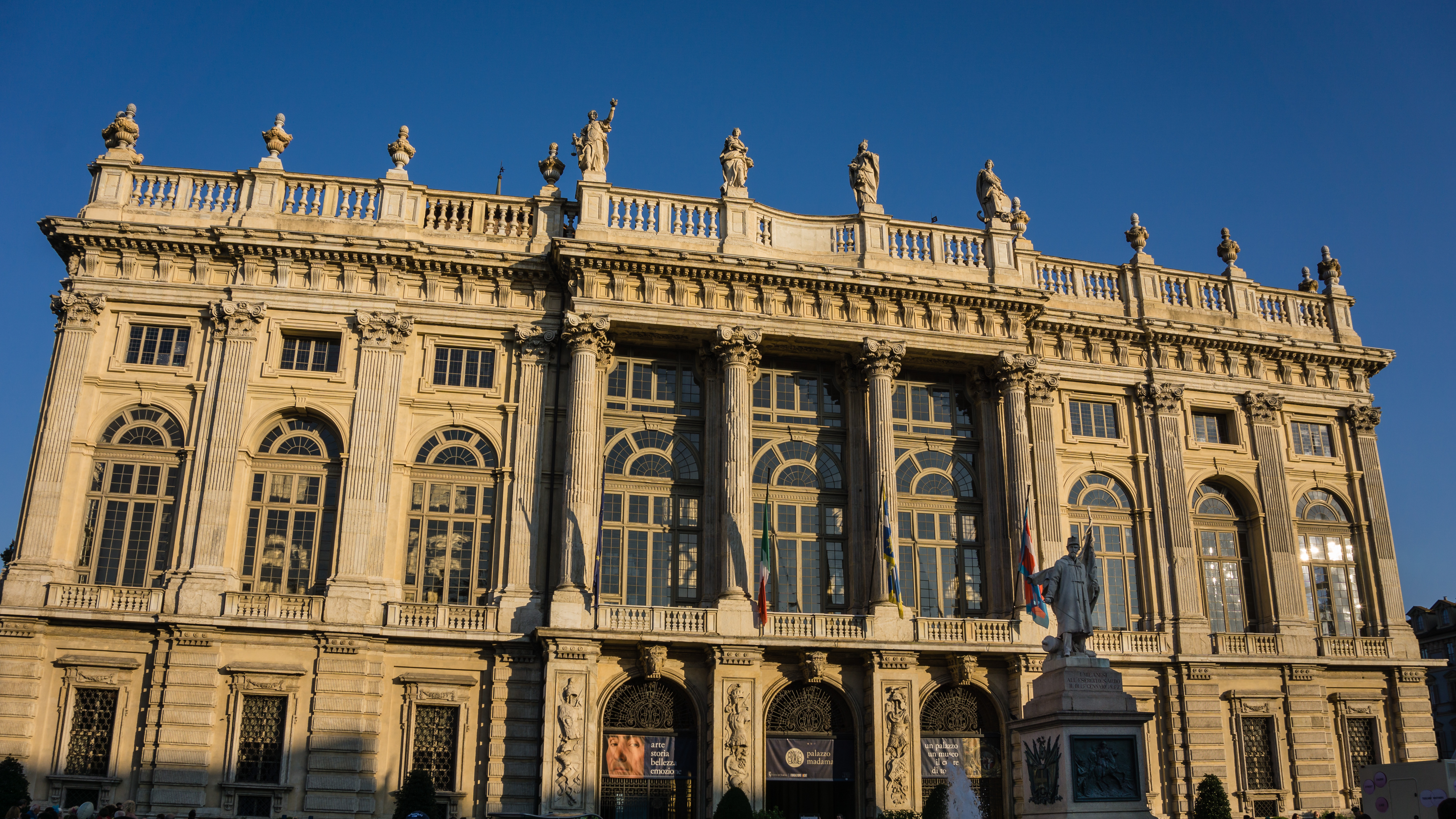
Palazzo Madama, Turin

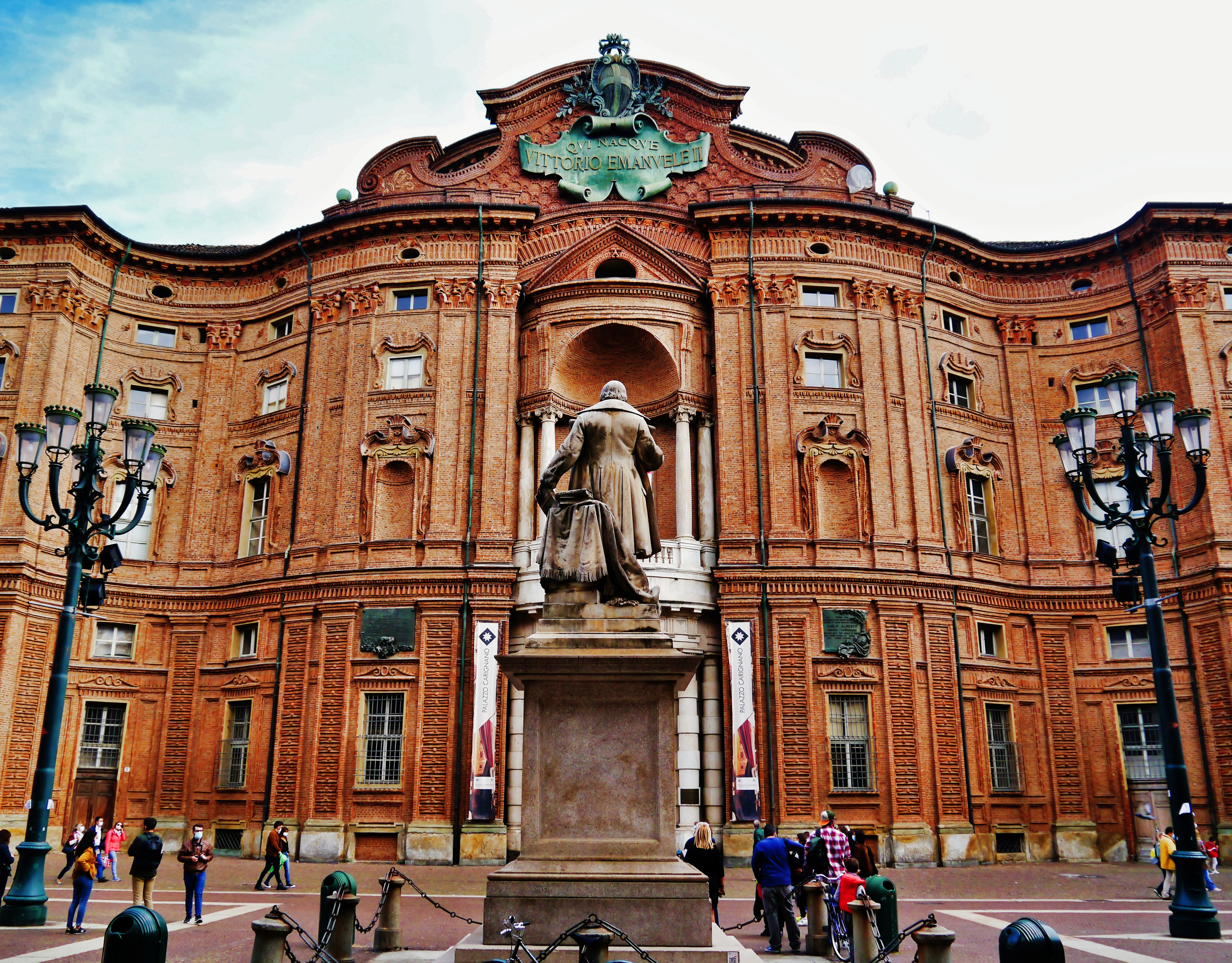
Palazzo Carignano

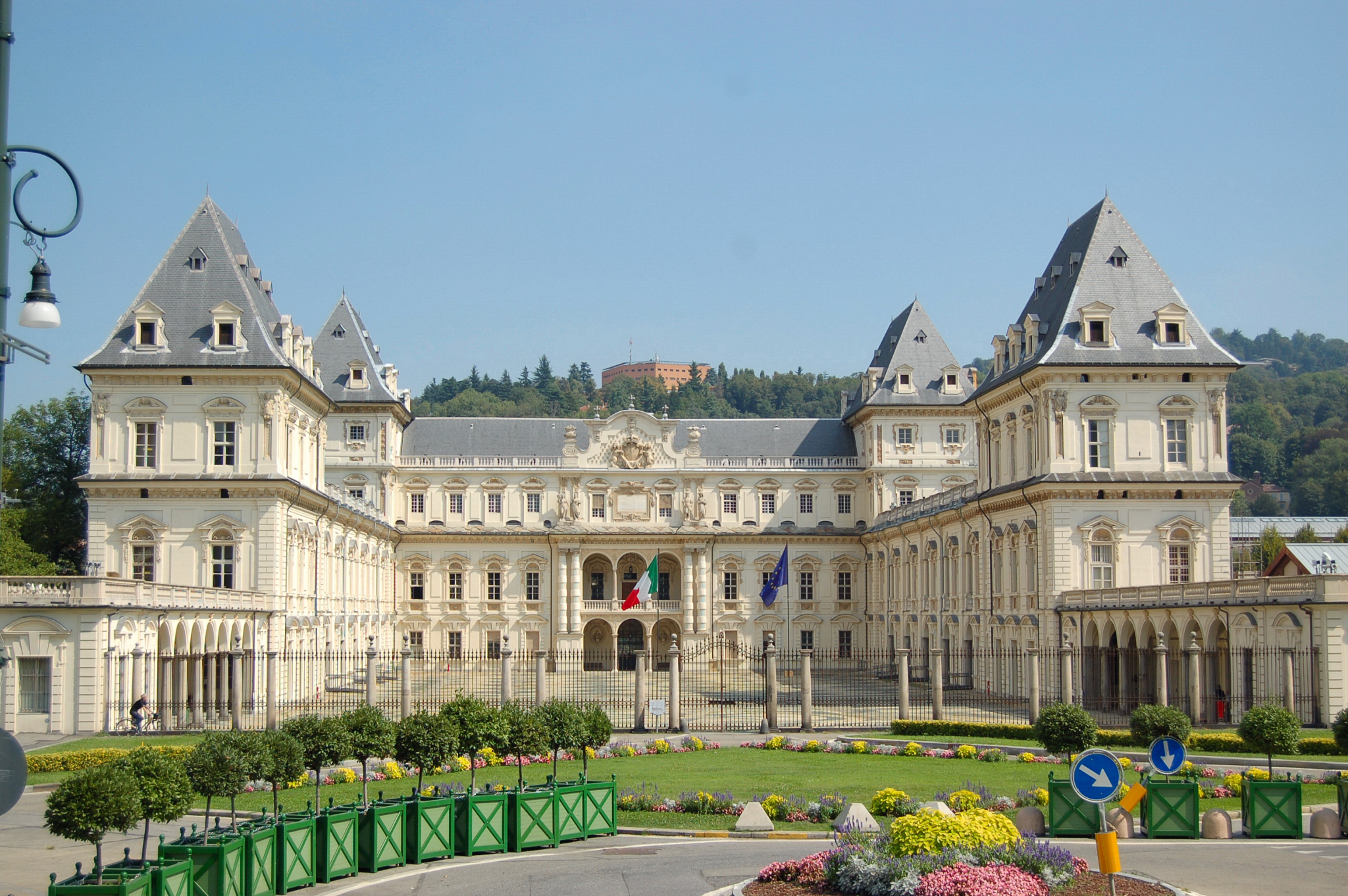
Castello del Valentino

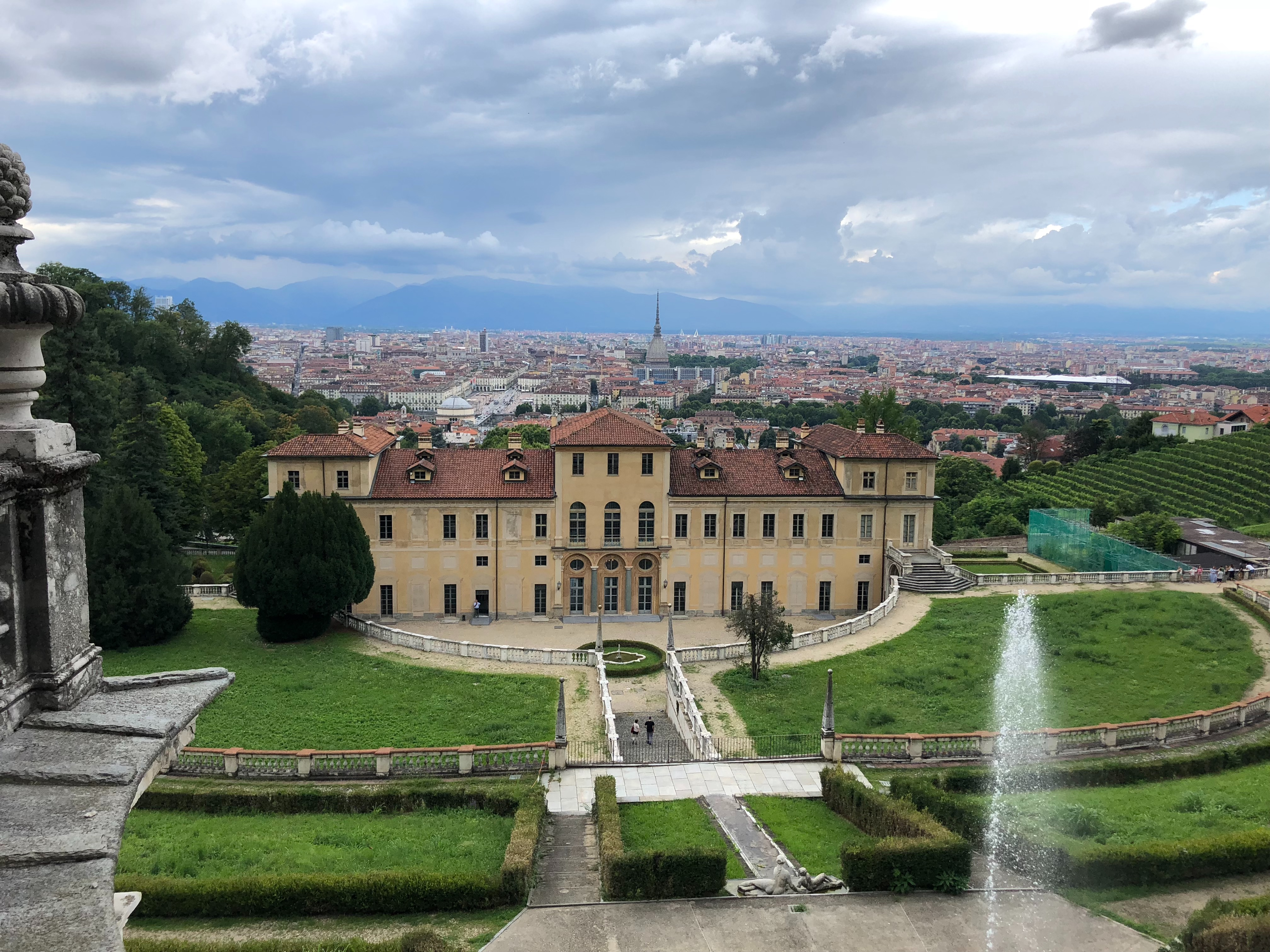
Villa della Regina

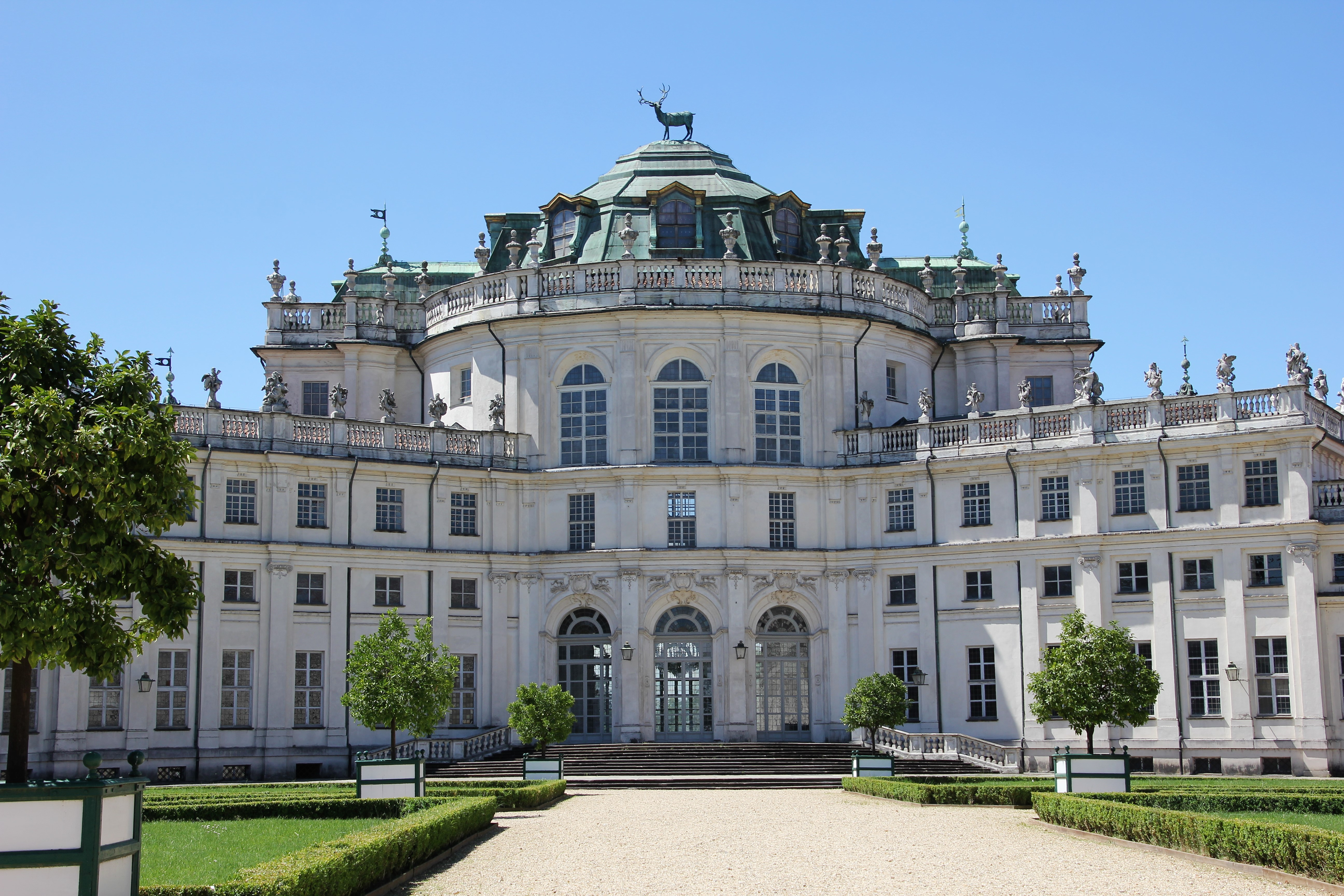
Palazzina di caccia of Stupinigi

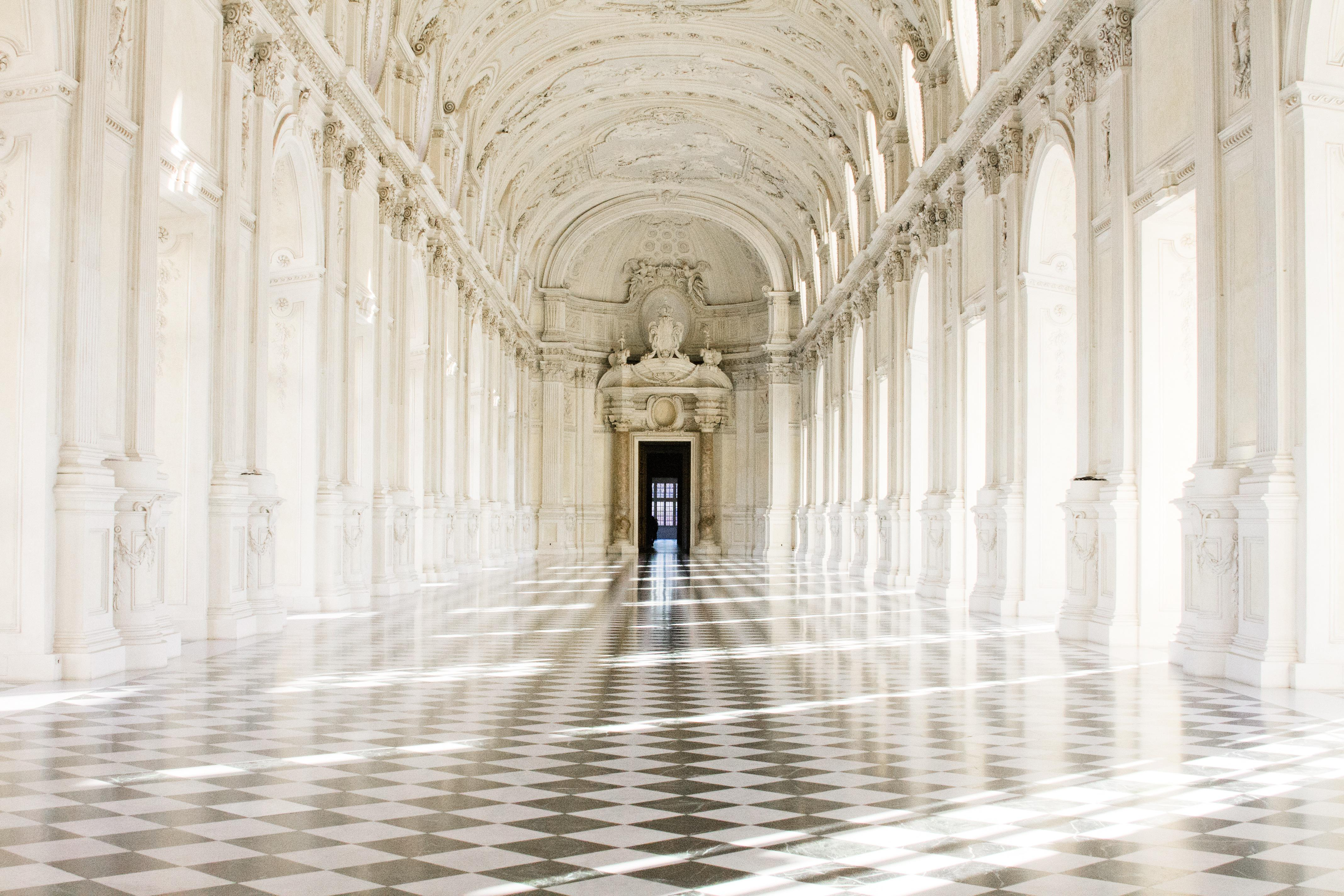
Palace of Venaria

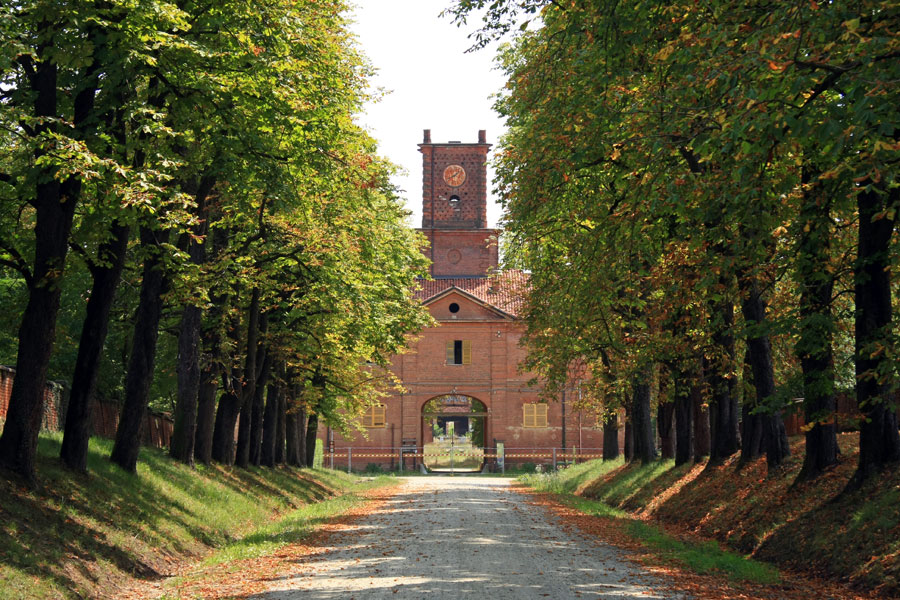
Castle of La Mandria

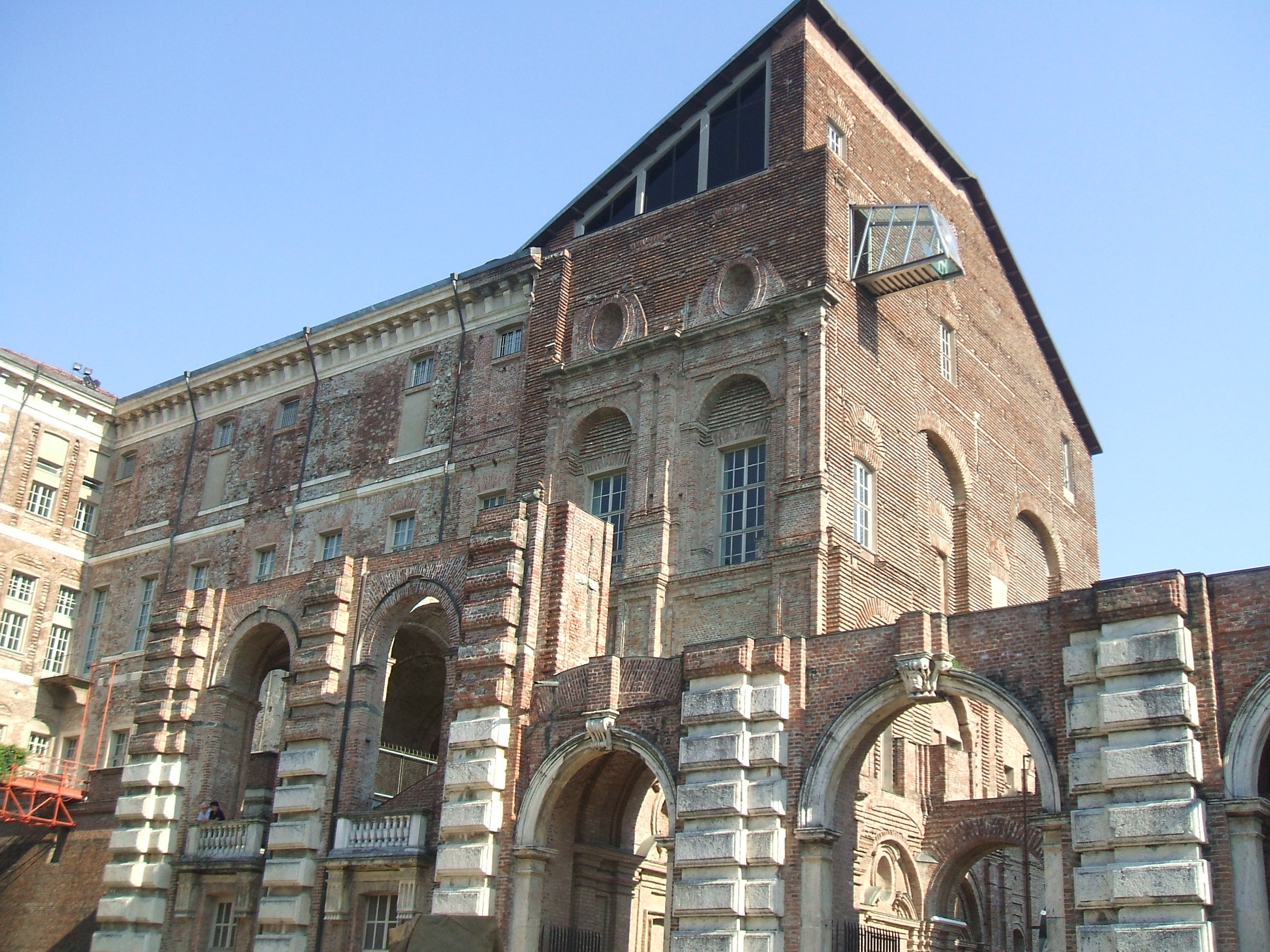
Castle of Rivoli

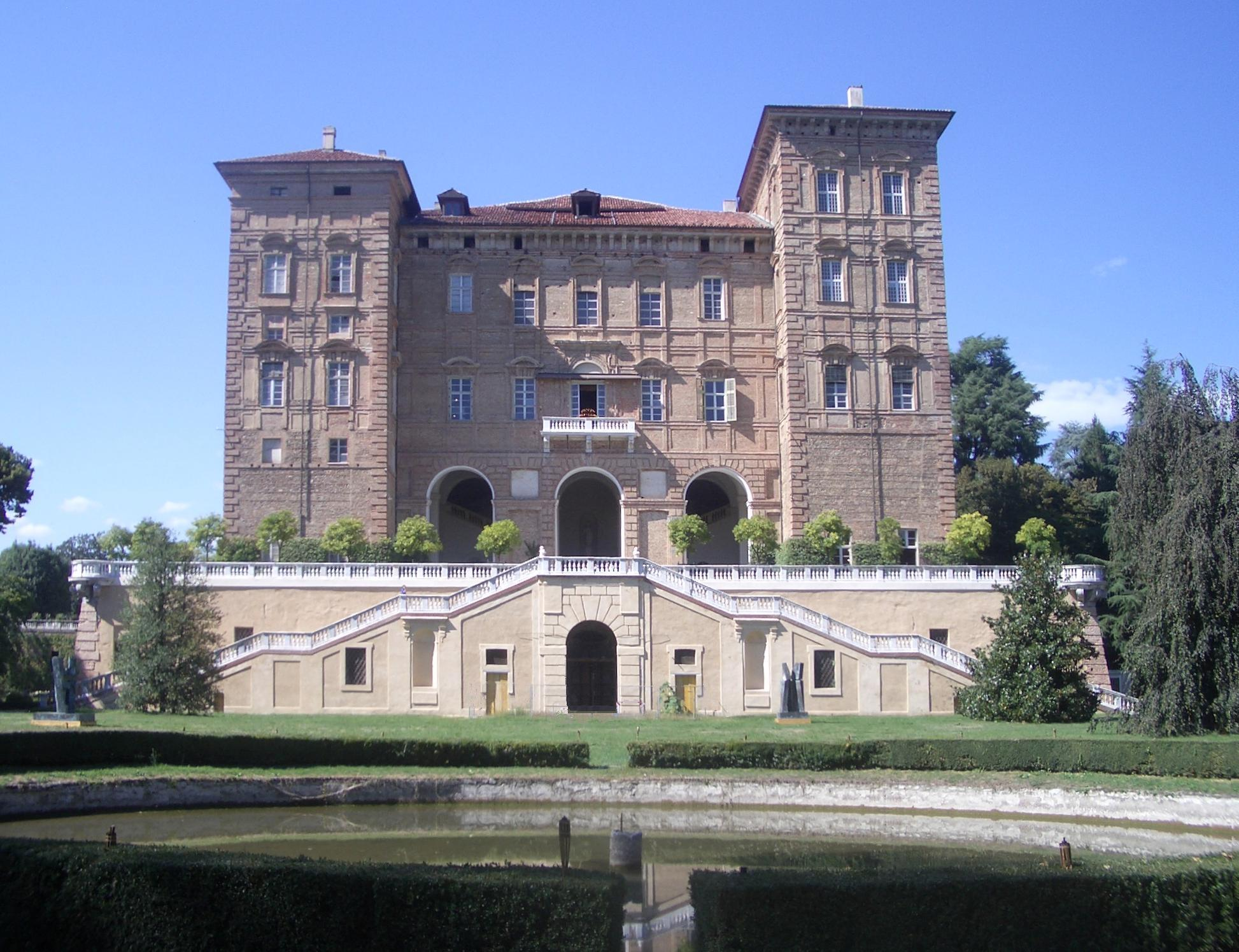
Agliè Castle

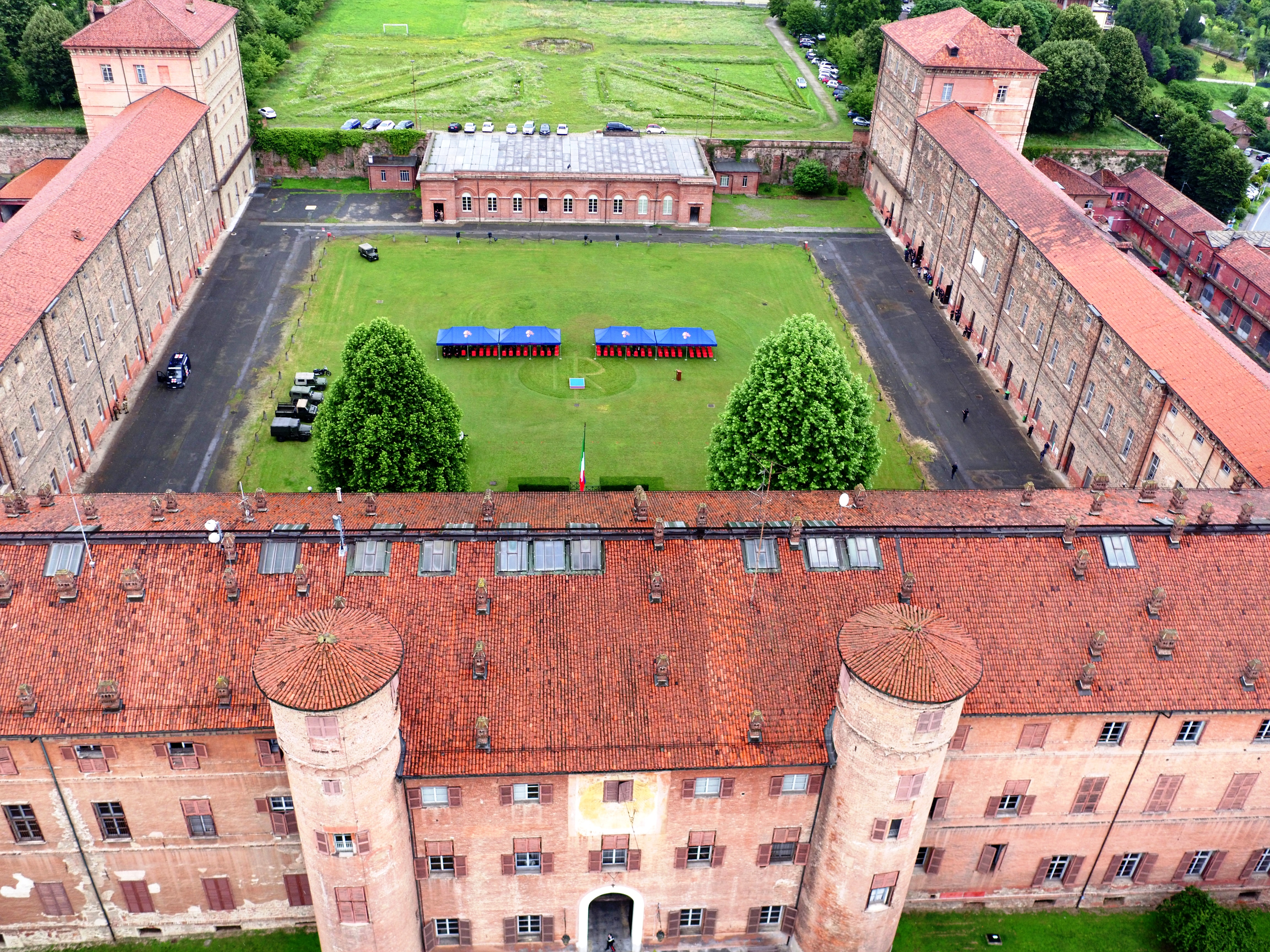
Castle of Moncalieri

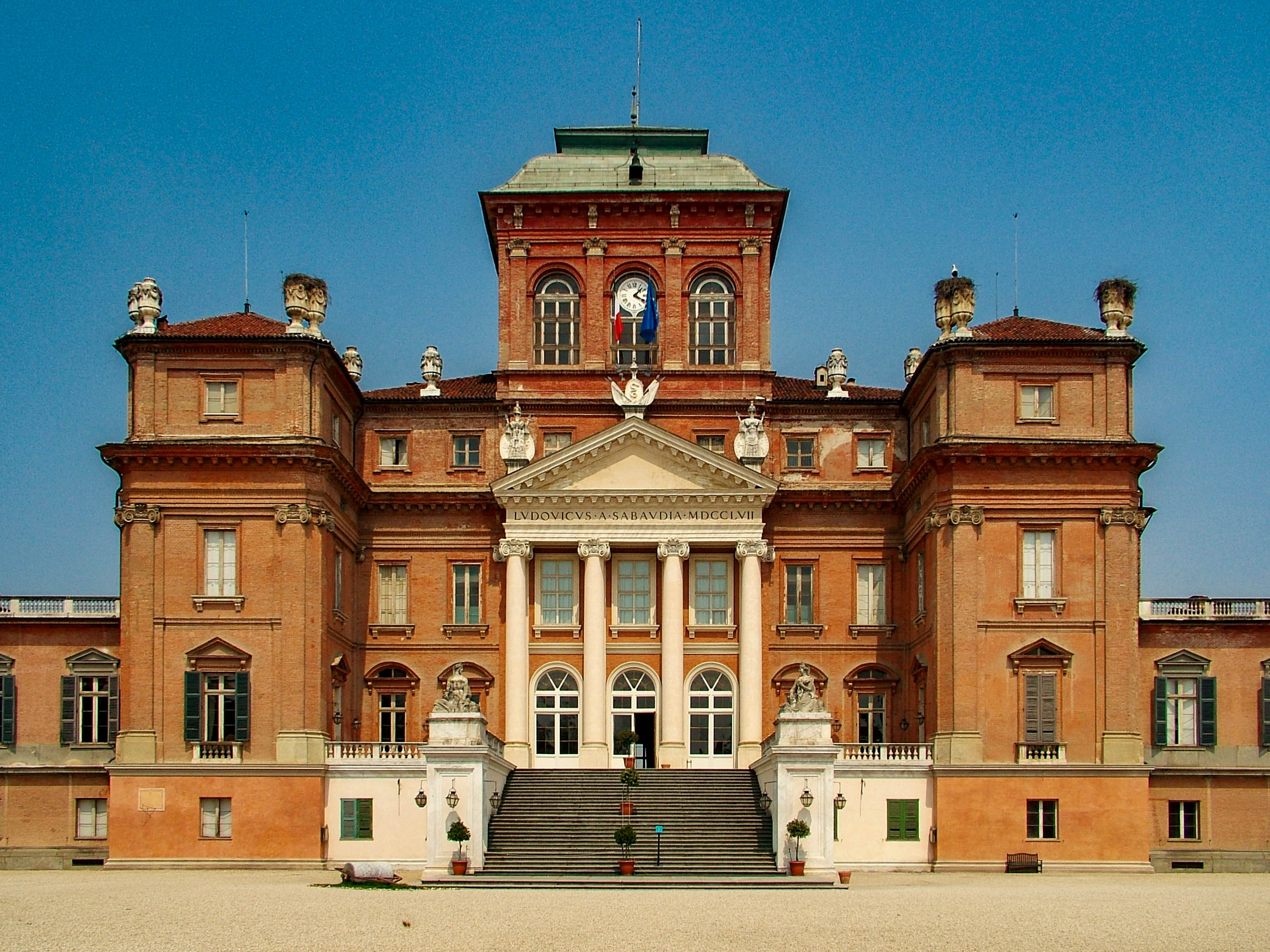
Castle of Racconigi

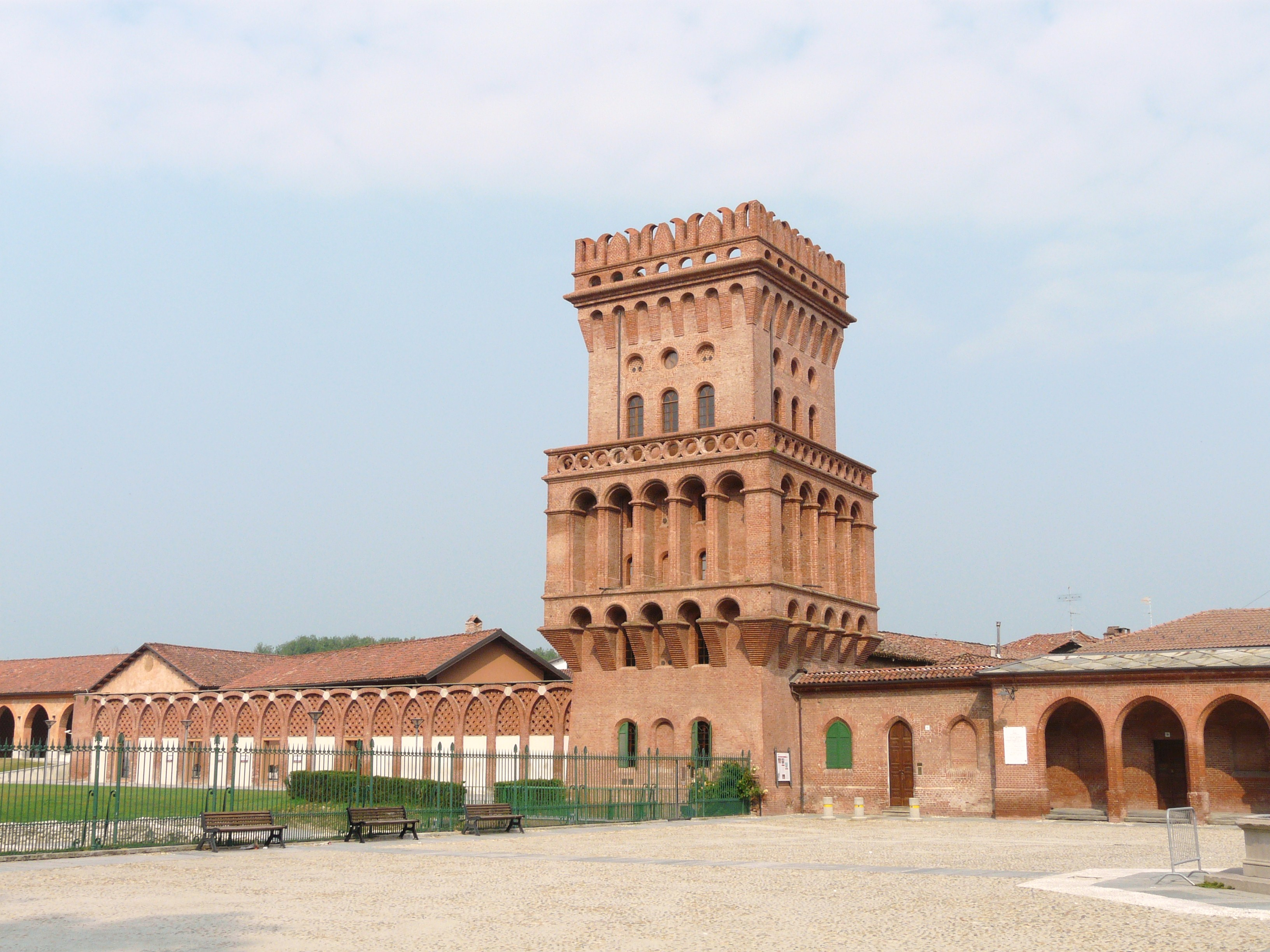
Castle of Pollenzo

== Residences ==
- In Turin:
  - Palazzo Reale
  - Palazzo Madama
  - Palazzo Carignano
  - Castello del Valentino
  - Villa della Regina
- Elsewhere in Metropolitan City of Turin:
  - Palazzina di Stupinigi
  - Reggia di Venaria Reale
  - Castle of La Mandria
  - Castle of Rivoli
  - Castle of Moncalieri
- Elsewhere in Piedmont:
  - Castle of Racconigi
  - Castle of Agliè
  - Pollenzo Estate
  - Castle of Govone

== See also ==
- County of Savoy
- Duchy of Savoy
- Kingdom of Sardinia
- Kingdom of Italy
