= Villar-Perosa =

Villar-Perosa may refer to:

- Villar Perosa, an Italian comune
- Villar-Perosa aircraft submachine gun

== See also ==
- Perosa (disambiguation)
