= Torre Canavese =

- Comune
- Comune di Torre Canavese
- Coat of arms

- Location within Italy Location within Piedmont
- Coordinates: 45°23′N 7°46′E
- Country: Italy
- Region: Piedmont
- Metropolitan city: Turin (TO)

Area
  - Total: 5.5 km^{2} (2.1 sq mi)
- Elevation: 417 m (1,368 ft)

Population (Dec. 2004)
  - Total: 617
  - Density: 110/km^{2} (290/sq mi)
- Demonym: Torresi
- Time zone: UTC+1 (CET)
  - Summer (DST): UTC+2 (CEST)
- Postal code: 10010
- Dialing code: 0124
- Website: Official website

Torre Canavese (Piedmontese: La Tor Bèr) is a comune (municipality) in the Metropolitan City of Turin in the Italian region Piedmont, located about 35 kilometres (22 mi) north of Turin.

Torre Canavese borders the following municipalities: Castellamonte, Quagliuzzo, Strambinello, Baldissero Canavese, San Martino Canavese, Bairo, and Agliè.

Torre Canavese is a city in the province of Torino in Northern Italy. Torre means tower in Italy, in this case, "Torre" refers to the tower on the city's castle. It is located about 40 kilometres (25 mi) from Torino and 14 kilometres (9 mi) from Ivrea. Torre is an agricultural town in which many of the residents grow their own fruits and vegetables. Within the confines of Torre, there is a castle and a Catholic church, the church tower was built by Savino Barello. Each year on Fat Tuesday there is a town gathering at the bar where the citizens gather and eat beans—cooked in a terra cotta pot over an open flame—and soup. The weather ranges from the 90s in the summer to the mid-20s in the winter. Because Torre is located in the Pre-Alps the city can have a few feet of snow in the winter.

== Demographic evolution ==
Historical population

Year	Pop.	±%
1861	876	—
1871	872	−0.5%
1881	904	+3.7%
1901	764	−15.5%
1911	792	+3.7%

Year	Pop.	±%
1921	744	−6.1%
1931	642	−13.7%
1936	601	−6.4%
1951	570	−5.2%
1961	546	−4.2%

Year	Pop.	±%
1971	577	+5.7%
1981	591	+2.4%
1991	604	+2.2%
2001	628	+4.0%

Source: Data from ISTAT

== Curiosity ==
In Torre Canavese in 2009 the set designer Massimo Antonello Geleng created a theme park called Viassa Felliniana and dedicated to the director Federico Fellini. (Info by the Dizionario del Turismo Cinematografico)
