= Ozegna =

- Comune
- Comune di Ozegna
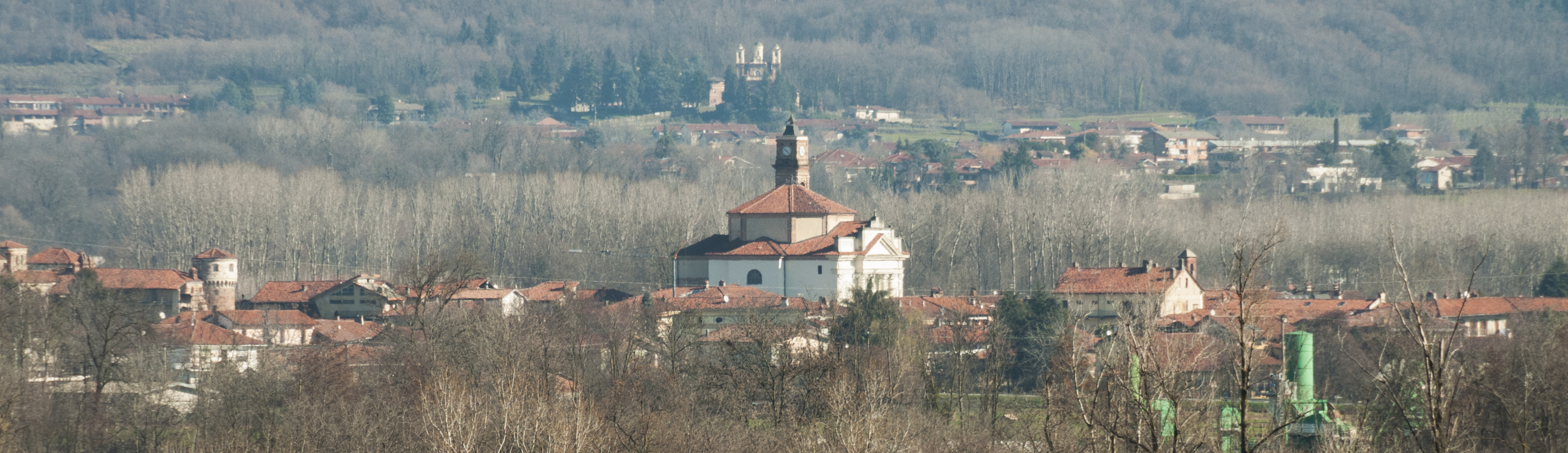

- Coat of arms

- Location within Italy Location within Piedmont
- Coordinates: 45°21′N 7°45′E
- Country: Italy
- Region: Piedmont
- Metropolitan city: Turin (TO)

Government
  - Mayor: Sergio Bartoli

Area
  - Total: 5.41 km^{2} (2.09 sq mi)
- Elevation: 300 m (980 ft)

Population (31 December 2017)
  - Total: 1,225
  - Density: 226/km^{2} (586/sq mi)
- Demonym: Ozegnesi
- Time zone: UTC+1 (CET)
  - Summer (DST): UTC+2 (CEST)
- Postal code: 10080
- Dialing code: 0124
- Patron saint: Nativity of Mary
- Saint day: 8 September
- Website: Official website

Ozegna is a comune (municipality) in the Metropolitan City of Turin in the Italian region Piedmont, located about 30 kilometres (19 mi) north of Turin.

The village is home to the Ozegna Castle.
