= Scarmagno =

- Comune
- Comune di Scarmagno
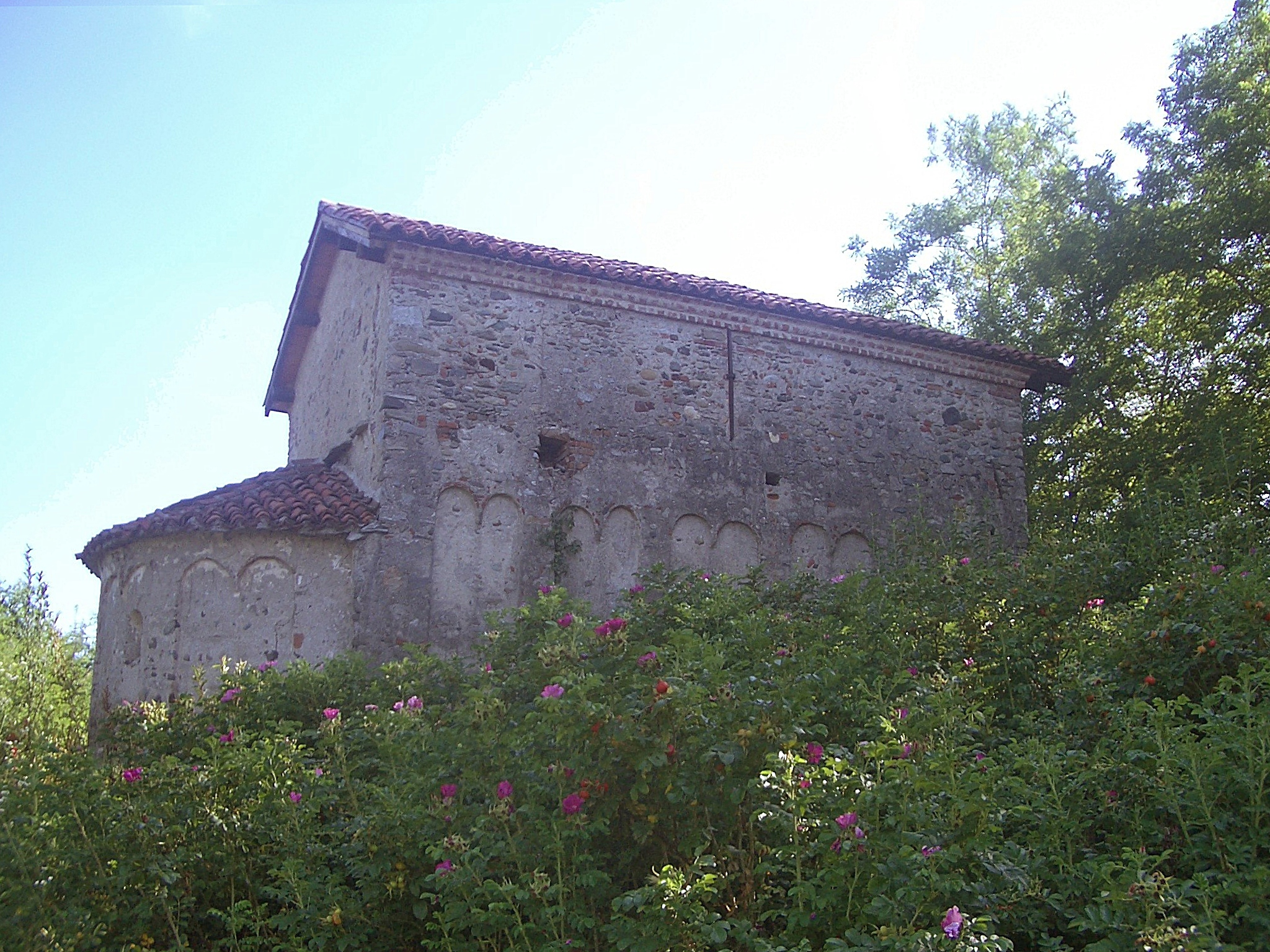
- Romanesque church of Sant'Eusebio al Masero.

- Coat of arms

- Location within Italy Location within Piedmont
- Coordinates: 45°23′N 7°50′E
- Country: Italy
- Region: Piedmont
- Metropolitan city: Turin (TO)

Government
  - Mayor: Pier Luigi Bot Sartor

Area
  - Total: 8.0 km^{2} (3.1 sq mi)
- Elevation: 278 m (912 ft)

Population (31 December 2010)
  - Total: 811
  - Density: 100/km^{2} (260/sq mi)
- Demonym: Scarmagnesi
- Time zone: UTC+1 (CET)
  - Summer (DST): UTC+2 (CEST)
- Postal code: 10010
- Dialing code: 0125
- Patron saint: St. Michael
- Website: Official website

Scarmagno is a comune (municipality) in the Metropolitan City of Turin in the Italian region Piedmont, located about 35 kilometres (22 mi) northeast of Turin.

Since the 1960s, it was home to a large plant of the Olivetti company, which, for some periods, produced up to 200,000 personal computers a year. The factory closed down following Olivetti's acquisition by Telecom Italia in the early 2000s, and was damaged by fire in 2013. In 2021, EV battery maker ItalVolt announced plans to build a factory on the former Olivetti site, however the deal did not proceed.

The Romanesque church of Sant'Eusebio al Masero (10th century), has a fresco from 1424 by Domenico della Marca di Ancona.

The town has a gate on the A5 Turin-Aosta motorway.
