= Palace of Venaria =

Former royal residence in Italy

- Reggia di Venaria Reale
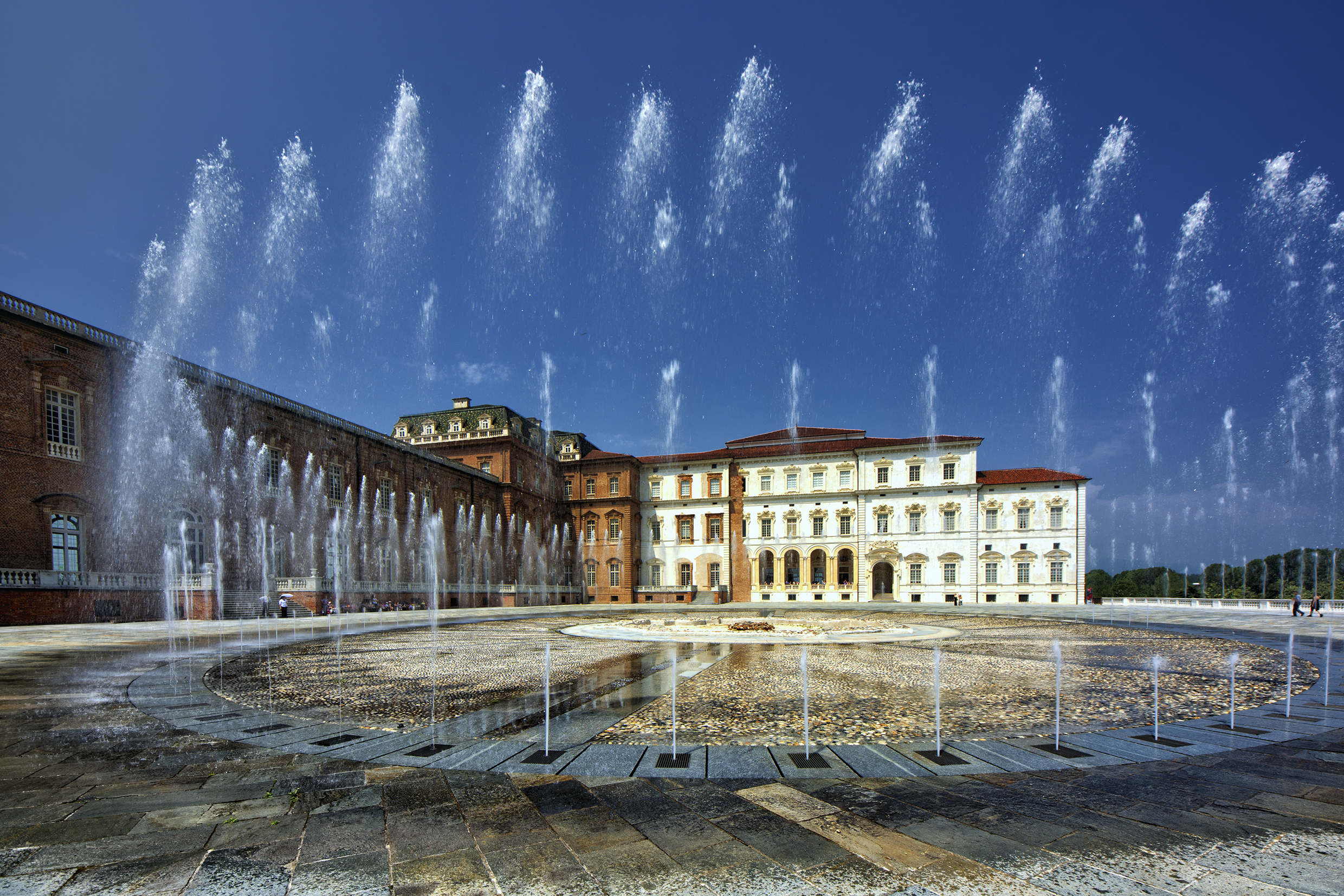
- View of the Palace
- Interactive fullscreen map

General information
- Location: Venaria Reale, Metropolitan City of Turin, Italy
- Coordinates: 45°08′09″N 7°37′25″E

Technical details
- Floor area: 80,000 m^{2} (861,112 ft^{2})

Website
- www.lavenaria.it

UNESCO World Heritage Site
- Official name: Reggia di Venaria Reale - Residences of the Royal House of Savoy
- Type: Cultural
- Criteria: i, ii, vi, v
- Designated: 1997 (21st session)
- Reference no.: 823
- Region: Europe

The Palace of Venaria (Italian: Reggia di Venaria Reale) is a former royal residence and gardens located in Venaria Reale, near the city of Turin in the Piedmont region in northern Italy. It is one of the 14 Residences of the Royal House of Savoy built in the area between the 16th and 18th centuries which were collectively designated a UNESCO World Heritage Site in 1997.

The palace was designed and built from 1675 by Amedeo di Castellamonte, commissioned by Duke Charles Emmanuel II, who needed a base for his hunting expeditions in the heathy hill country north of Turin. The name itself derives from the Latin phrase Venatio Regia meaning "Royal Hunt". It was later enlarged to become a luxurious residence for the House of Savoy. During that time, the palace complex became a masterpiece of Baroque architecture and was filled with decoration and artwork. It fell into disuse at the end of the 18th century. After the Napoleonic Wars, it was used for military purposes until 1978, when its renovation began, leading to the largest restoration project in European history. It finally opened to the public on October 13, 2007, and it has since become a major tourist attraction and exhibition space.

It is noted for its monumental architecture and Baroque interiors by Filippo Juvarra, including the Galleria Grande and its marble decorations, the chapel of Saint Uberto, and its extensive gardens. The palace received 1,048,857 visitors in 2017, making it the sixth most visited museum in Italy.

== History ==
=== 17th-century construction ===
Charles Emmanuel II, Duke of Savoy (1634–1675) was inspired by the earlier Castle of Mirafiori (Italian: Castello di Mirafiori), built by Duke Charles Emmanuel I (1562–1630) for his wife Catalina Micaela of Spain (1567–1597) in what is today the southern suburb of Turin.

Keen to leave a memorial dedicated to himself and his wife, Marie Jeanne Baptiste of Savoy-Nemours (1644–1724), Charles Emmanuel II bought two small villages just north of the city, Altessano Superiore and Altessano Inferiore, from the landowner family Birago of Milanese origin, who had used the land for farming. The place was renamed Venaria for its future function as a hunting lodge (Venatio in Latin). The construction of this residence was part of the larger plan of building the so-called "Garland of Delights" (Corona di Delizie), a chain of palaces and leisure residences around Turin, which also included the hunting lodge of Stupinigi, the Castle of Rivoli, the Queen's Villa, and others.

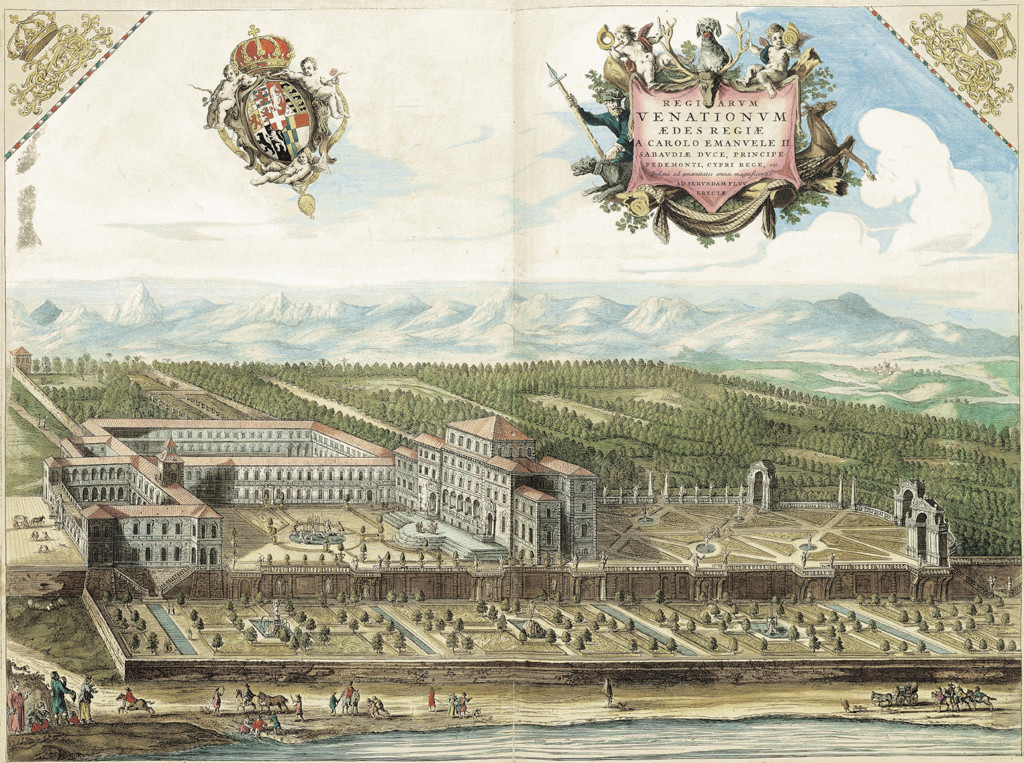
The 17th century Palace of Diana and gardens as built by Amedeo di Castellamonte

In 1658 Charles Emmanuel II commissioned the project to build the palace and a small town around it to the architect Amedeo di Castellamonte, whose father Carlo was the chief architect of Charles Emmanuel I and whose work had popularized Piedmontese Baroque.

The ambitious plan envisioned a grandiose complex including the palace, gardens, hunting woods, and also a new town, with scenic vistas. The new town's plan had a circular layout, imitating the round shape of the collar of the Supreme Order of the Most Holy Annunciation, a dynastic order created by the House of Savoy. Construction began in 1659, and under the direction of Castellamonte work proceeded steadily, starting with the horse stable and the clock tower built in 1660.

Venaria Reale was much more than a hunting-palace, and must be viewed as an experimentation in urban planning transferred to the countryside, with the realization of a town attached to the residential complex by linear axes opening up into curved public spaces, the focal point of one of which was the church of Sant'Uberto, patron saint of the hunt. This organization was reported to have influenced Louis XIV’s thinking in 1669 about the future development of Versailles. Palace, church, and town operated as an integrated architectural and social unit, a miniature ideal city based on the notion of the princely hunt and the representation of the Duke as master of the natural world, frequently depicted on horseback as a classical emblem of sovereign authority.

The iconography of Venaria Reale was more than formalistic, and the decoration of the palace complex itself had been carefully plotted out by Emanuele Tesauro, the resident Jesuit savant at the court, who was frequently employed to devise iconographic programmes for decorative schemes. His celebration of the princely hunt was realized by a group of painters and stuccoists who came to play dominant roles in Charles-Emanuel’s patronage.

The Palace of Diana (Reggia di Diana), functioning as the central part of the palace intended to house the duke and the court, was built in several phases: it was first constructed on two levels with short side loggias, and then subsequently raised by adding two more floors, with the top floor intended as a belvedere, between 1660 and 1663. It was then further modified with the addition of smaller apartments considered more suitable for privacy compared to the halls and parade chambers of the central area of the palace.

The building was further expanded with the creation of pavilions facing the gardens in 1669, and then additional pavilions which close off the courtyards on both sides of the palace in 1671. The façade was built with a loggia on the first floor flanked by grand arched entrances, the left one of which was subsequently destroyed during the renovations led by Michelangelo Garove a few decades later. The palace layout denotes the influence of late 16th-century Roman works, such as the Villa Borghese gardens and Villa Mondragone.

Castellamonte also built the loggia and theater in the upper garden (1666), the square in front of the palace (1667), the twin façades of the churches in the town square (1669), the orangery and the Fountain of Hercules (1671), the Temple of Diana in the gardens (1673), as well as the porticos of the town's main street (1679). The entire complex is connected together along the straight axis that cut across the town and reaches the palace, follows the canal, and then leads to the Fountain of Hercules and finally the Temple of Diana in the gardens.

=== 18th-century additions ===
After the French army had destroyed some of the buildings on 1 October 1693, fighting against Savoy during the Nine Years' War, Duke of Savoy and the future King of Sardinia, Victor Amadeus II (1666–1732), decided to reconstruct the residence according to French style of the time, to rival the famous Palace of Versailles. Starting in 1699, he gave the project to the architect Michelangelo Garove, who proceeded to build an even more grandiose palace.

Garove's plan included a complete re-imagining of the palace according to contemporary standards. The Palace of Diana would now be flanked by two enormous wings to the north and south, with pavilions at each end. He also constructed the south-west pavilion (1702), the south-east pavilion (1703–13) and also began works on the Great Gallery in between, which remained unfinished by the time of his death in 1713. The two pavilions, connected by the Gallery, constituted the new south wing of Garove's plan. However, the planned north wing was never built.

The palace gardens were redesigned to conform to the French formal style, with views and perspectives continuing out to infinity based on the Versailles model, which at the time was considered the ideal royal residence. Garove's plans for these expansions were even sent for review and approval by Robert de Cotte, the architect of the French court. In the gardens Garove demolished the Temple of Diana (1700), traced and extended the Royal Alley (1702), demolished the 17th-century citroneria (1703), traced the English Garden (1710), built the Green Apartments and demolished the 17th-century Loggia Theatre (1711).

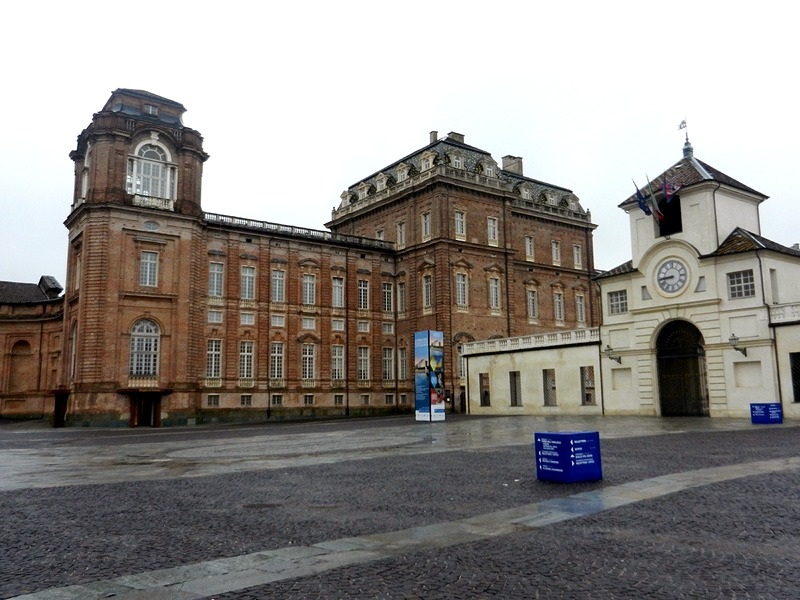
Clock tower and the south-east pavilion and Belvedere tower built by Michelangelo Garove

Further damage to the complex was inflicted during the 1706 Siege of Turin, when French troops under Louis d'Aubusson de La Feuillade were garrisoned there during the War of the Spanish Succession. After the Savoyard victory, Victor Amadeus II entrusted Filippo Juvarra in 1716 to enlarge the palace. Juvarra then completed the Great Gallery (1716), set up the south-east pavilion, built the new citroneria and the Great Stable (Scuderia Grande) in 1722–27, and also built the St. Hubert's chapel (Cappella Di Sant'Uberto). In the gardens, Juvarra demolished the remaining foundations of the Temple of Diana in 1719, and in 1725 replaced it with a labyrinth and another pavilion. The façades were also renovated in the French style, which turned the palace into a masterpiece or Baroque architecture.

In 1739 Charles Emmanuel III (1701–1773) tasked the new building director Benedetto Alfieri with building connecting structures across the still disjointed wings of the palace. To do so, Alfieri demolished the old clock tower and rebuilt it in the same location (1739), erected the Belvedere wing (1751), the gallery between the chapel and the citroneria (1754), the small western stable (1758) and the eastern stable (1760), and the indoor riding halls (1761). In 1788–89 architects Giuseppe Battista Piacenza and Carlo Randoni created the staircase on the façade of the Palace of Diana, and added decorative elements in line with the neoclassical taste of the time and the style of the new apartments on the first floor, intended for Victor Emmanuel I (1759–1824), putting an end to the architectural evolution of the complex.

In spite of renovations, in the 18th century the palace was often overlooked by the royal family, in favor of the hunting lodge of Stupinigi (Palazzina di Caccia di Stupinigi; 1729) which was by then more in tune with the tastes of contemporary European courts. Nevertheless, the palace continued to be used during the reigns of Victor Amadeus III (r. 1773–1796) and Charles Emmanuel IV (r. 1796–1802).

=== Military use and abandonment ===
In 1792, the Kingdom of Sardinia (which included Piedmont), joined several European powers in the War of the First Coalition against the French First Republic, but by 1796 it was defeated by Napoleon's Army of italy and forced to sign the Treaty of Paris in May, ceding the original Duchy of Savoy and the County of Nice to France, and giving the French Revolutionary Army free passage through Piedmont. On 6 December 1798 Napoleon's general, Barthélemy Catherine Joubert, occupied Turin and forced Charles Emmanuel IV to abdicate and leave for Sardinia. The provisional government in Turin then voted to unite Piedmont with France. In 1799 Austrian forces briefly occupied the city, but after the Battle of Marengo in June 1800 the French regained control.

During the Napoleonic domination in the early 19th century, the buildings of the palace complex were turned into military barracks, and the gardens were destroyed to create a training ground, damaging the complex irreversibly. Because of the heavy damage sustained during the French occupation, once Napoleon was defeated and the Kingdom of Sardinia restored at the Congress of Vienna in 1815, the palace did not revert to its previous role as a royal residence, but became permanent property of the Royal Sardinian Army, as Royal Military Domain (Regio Demanio Militare). The decorations and furniture that could still be salvaged were then transferred to other palaces and castles owned by the House of Savoy, and the role of the royal summer residence was taken up by the castles and palaces at Racconigi, Stupinigi, and Agliè.

In its new role as a military facility, from 1851 to 1943 the complex was used for various purposes by the Royal Italian Army. It served as headquarters of the Field Artillery Regiment "a Cavallo", the Royal Military School (today Scuola di cavalleria dell'Esercito Italiano), and the 5th Field Artillery Regiment. By the early 1900s the military started abandoning the site, and the property was gradually transferred to the Italian Ministry of Culture, starting in 1936 with the Chapel of St. Hubert.

=== Restoration ===
Once the military garrison left the site, the palace became prey to vandalism and began to decay. Because of lack of funding, the interventions financed by the Ministry of Culture were minimal, with only essential maintenance to preserve the structural integrity of the buildings. A small-scale restoration of the Chapel was undertaken in the 1940s.

In 1961, to mark the celebration of the 100th anniversary of the unification of Italy, the Great Gallery and the Hall of Diana were briefly restored, albeit in a mostly cosmetic manner. In the 1960s, a group of locals from Venaria Reale started an association (Coordinamento Venariese per la Tutela e Restauro del Castello) to protect the castle as a cultural landmark, which managed to do some limited restoration work. Starting in the 1980s, some public funding was granted for the early work of redevelopment and restoration, as well as raising public awareness about the complex.

On 5 December 1996, the Minister for Culture Walter Veltroni, in agreement with the President of Piedmont Enzo Ghigo, established a special-purpose Committee for Reggia di Venaria, which started the long process of restoration of the palace. In 1999 the first framework agreement was signed the Ministry of Culture, the Piedmont Region, the City of Turin, and the municipalities of Venaria Reale and Druento. Overall the work on restoring the complex lasted eight years from 1999 to 2007, and was the largest restoration project in European history.

The project involved some 700 experts and about 300 companies and contractors, involving a total of some 1,800 workers, with some 100 designers selected from 16 international tenders. The work involved restoring the Venaria Palace, the adjoining village, the castle at the nearby La Mandria Regional Park, the gardens and the park. The funds spent amounted to more than €300 million (€50 million from the Ministry of Culture, €80 million from the Piedmont Region, and €170 million from the European Union), which allowed the restoration of the entire complex and the total surface area of 240,000 m^{2}, and another 800,000 m^{2} of gardens and parkland.

In December 1997 the palace was added to the UNESCO Heritage List as one of 14 former royal properties in and around Turin grouped collectively as the Residences of the Royal House of Savoy, including other local landmarks such as the Royal Palace of Turin.

The restored complex finally opened to visitors in October 2007, and has since become a major tourist destination and space hosting exhibitions and events. It received 1,048,857 visitors in 2017, making it the sixth most visited museum in Italy. In October 2019 the palace gardens were named Italy's most beautiful park by an Italian park association. In 2022 the palace's restaurant was awarded a Michelin star. In recent years, the palace was also used as a filming location for several high-budget movies, including Miss Marx (2020) and The King's Man (2021). The palace also hosted events in the run-up to the Eurovision Song Contest 2022 held in Turin.

== Architecture ==
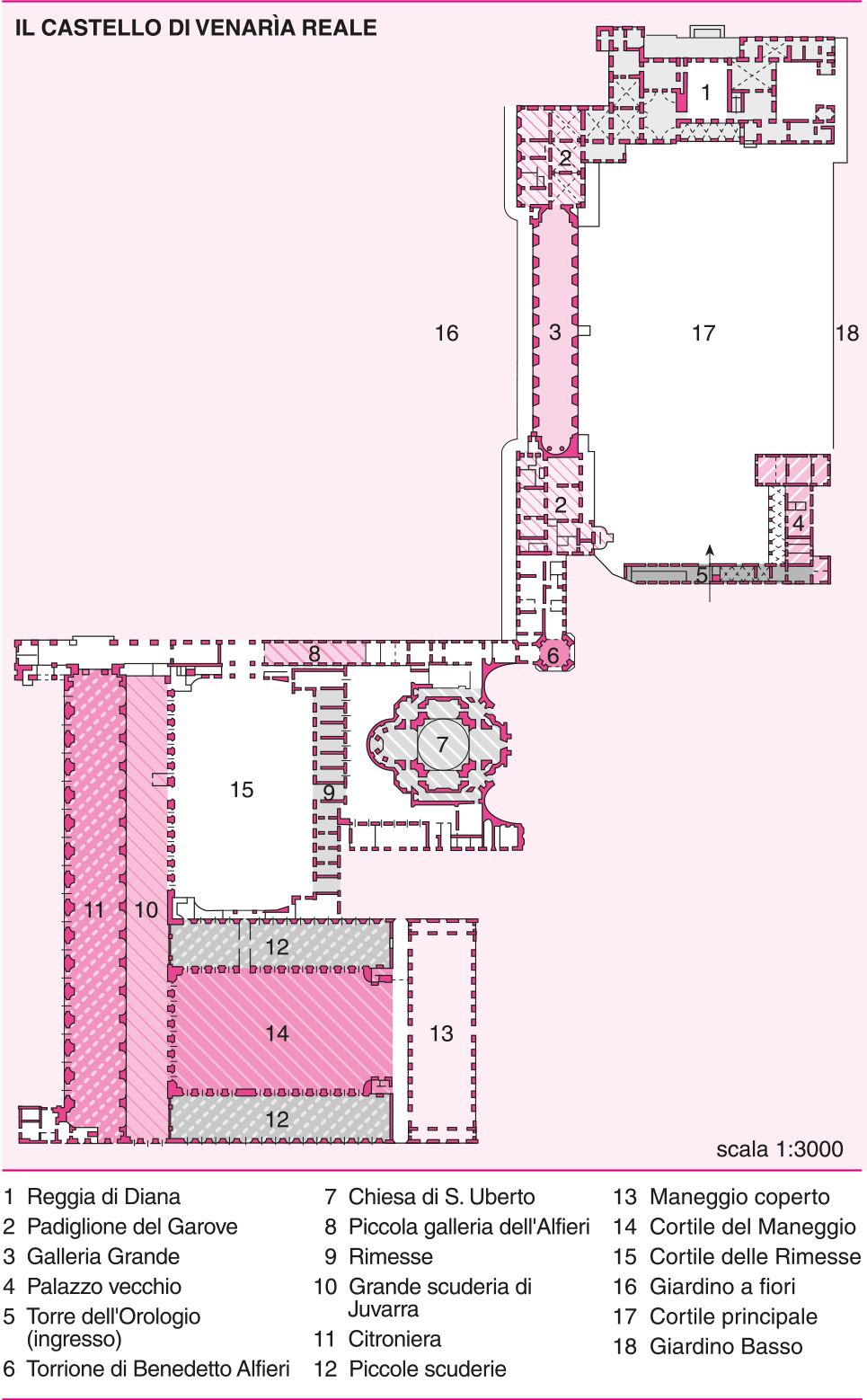
The Castle of Venaria Reale. (1) Palace of Diana. (2) Garove Pavilion. (3) Great Gallery. (4) Old Palace. (5) Clock Tower (entrance). (6) Tower by Benedetto Alfieri. (7) Church of S. Uberto. (8) Small Alfieri gallery. (9) Carriage sheds. (10) Great Juvarra stable. (11) Orangery. (12) Small stables. (13) Indoor riding hall. (14) Riding Hall Courtyard. (15) Courtyard of the Carriage Sheds. (16) Flower garden. (17) Main courtyard. (18) Lower garden.

=== The Palace ===
The palace is made up of two distinct wings: the original 17th century Palace of Diana, covered in white plaster, and the later 18th-century addition, with exposed brickwork. The entrance of the palace leads into the Cour d'honneur ("Honour Court"), which once housed a fountain with a deer.

=== Palace of Diana ===
The Palace of Diana is the core of the complex and the oldest section of the palace. It was built between 1658 and 1663 under the direction of Amedeo di Castellamonte. The main façade, covered with plaster and featuring cornucopias, shells and fruits, is connected on the right by section with the 18th-century wing. The façade facing the Honor Court presents a loggia flanked by an arched entryway on its right. Originally, there was a twin archway on the left of the loggia, but it was removed during Garove's reworking.

The Cour d'honneur leads into the Sala di Diana (Hall of Diana), situated in the Palace of Diana, which functions as the heart of the palace. It is a rectangular room, decorated with stuccoes and paintings centered on the theme of hunting. These include the frescoed vault representing Olympus (work of Jan Miel) which pictures Jupiter offering a gift to Diana, huge equestrian portraits of the dukes and the court (works by various painters in the ducal service), and hunting-themed canvases by Jan Miel, including the Hunt for the Deer, the Hare, the Bear, the Fox, the Boar, the Death of the Deer, the Going to the Woods, the Assembly, the Curea.

=== 18th century wing ===
The two pavilion date to the Michelangelo Garove period (1669–1713) and are covered with multicolor pentagonal tiles in ceramics, which are united by a large gallery, known as Grand Gallery (Galleria Grande). The centerpiece of the 18th-century wing is the Galleria Grande (Grand Gallery), which is stucco decorations, 44 arched windows, and black and white tiled floor. The interiors originally housed a large collection of stuccos, statues, paintings (according to Amedeo di Castellamonte, up to 8,000) from some of the court artists of the times, such as Vittorio Amedeo Cignaroli, Pietro Domenico Olivero and Bernardino Quadri.

=== Gardens ===
The original gardens of the residence have now totally disappeared, since French troops turned them into training grounds. Earlier drawings show an Italian garden with three terraces connected by elaborate stairways and architectural features such as a clock tower in the first court, the fountain of Hercules, a theatre and parterres.

Recent works have recreated a park in modern style, exhibiting modern works by Giuseppe Penone, including a fake 12 m-high cedar housing the thermic discharges of the palace.

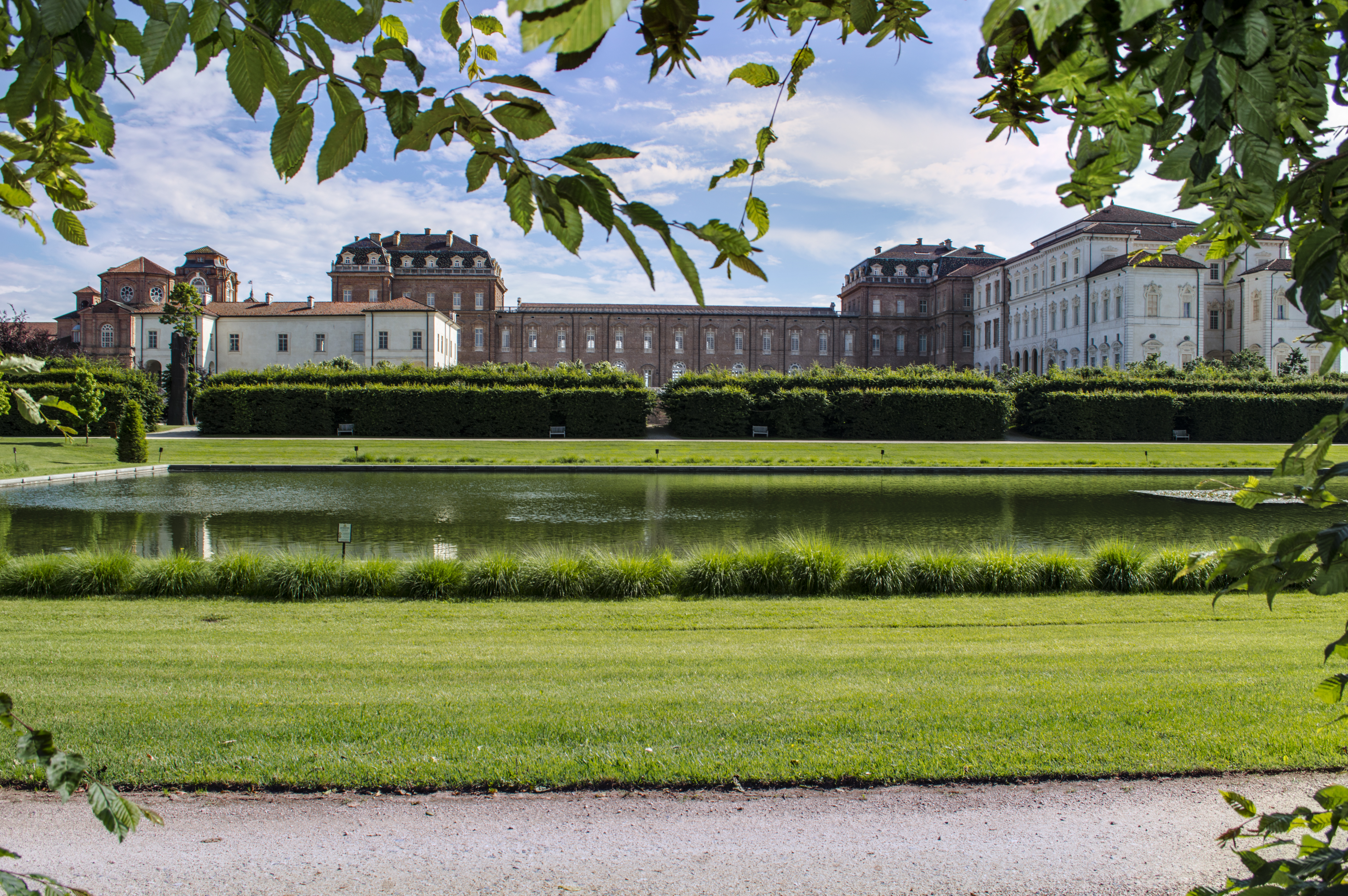
The palace with its gardens. The 17th-century wing on the right (in white plaster) while the 18th century wing is in the center (with a brick exterior).

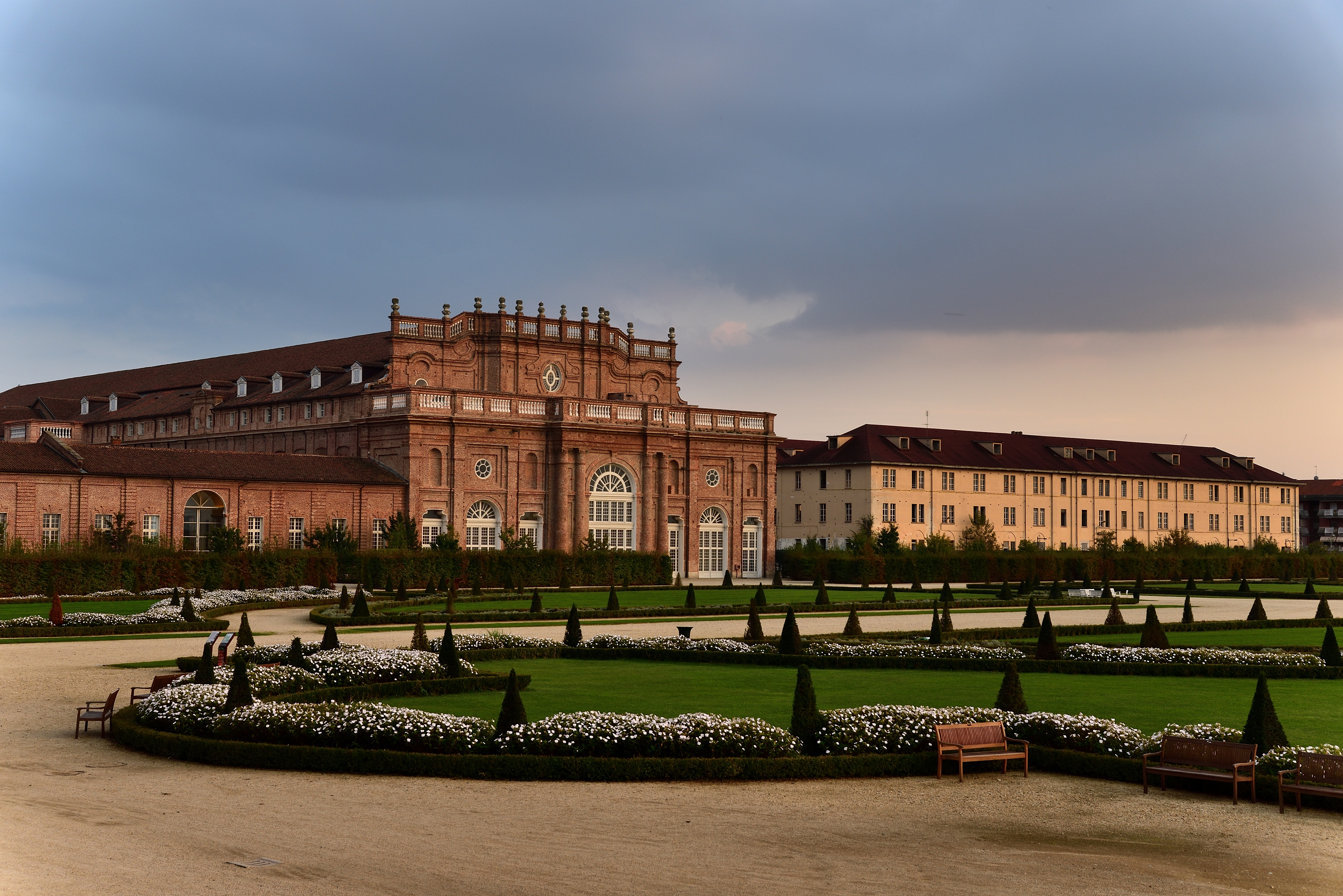
The Juvarra stables

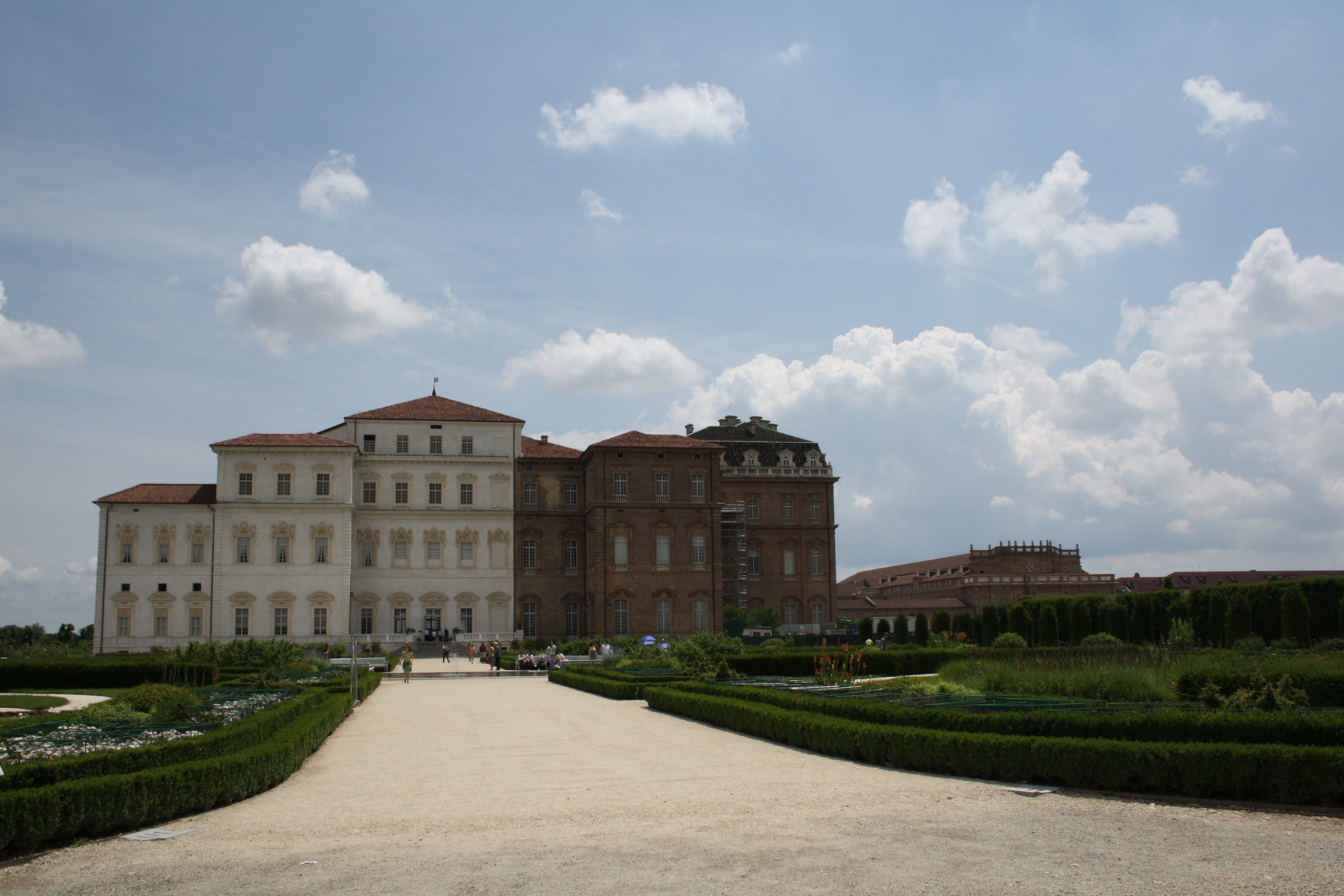
The palace seen from the gardens (17th century wing on the right, 18th century wing on the left)

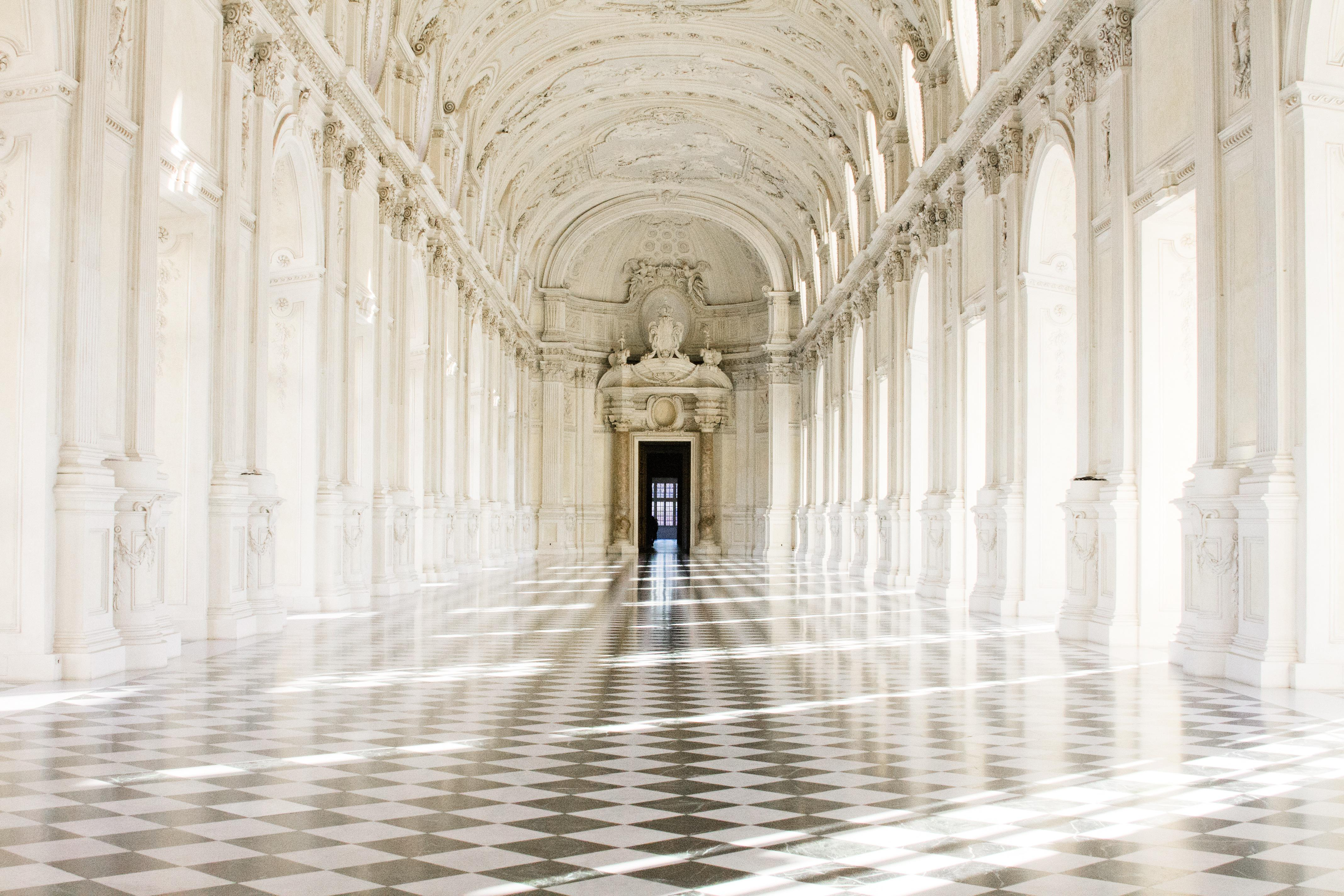
The Galleria Grande (Grand Gallery)

=== Juvarra Stables and Citroneria ===
The Juvarrian stables consist of a large atrium (room 57) overlooking the gardens, and a large vaulted room divided in two by a wall: the Scuderia Grande (Grand Stable, room 58) on the north side, and the Citroneria (orangery, room 59) on the side south. The Citroniera consists of a large vaulted gallery (148 meters long, 14 wide, and 16 high) whose ancient function was the winter storage of citrus fruits grown in the gardens. The side walls are decorated by niches that give the gallery dynamism, the south the walls feature large arches surmounted by oculi that overlook the gardens, while the north wall (which separates the room from the stables) has trompe l'oeil windows that mimics the arches of the south wall. The building is currently used for temporary exhibitions. The large stable (148 m long, 12 wide and 15 high) contained about 200 horses at the time and sheltered the north side of the Citroniera in winter. Currently, the room exhibits carriages, uniforms, and the Venetian Bucintoro. The latter was commissioned in Venice by Victor Amadeus II between 1729 and 1731. Among the carriages on display there is the golden gala sedan, commissioned by Victor Emmanuel II, the silver sedan of Queen Margherita and some carriages of Umberto I and Victor Emmanuel III. In addition, Napoleon's carriage on temporarily exhibition.

=== Church of Sant'Uberto ===
After the death of Garove (1713), Juvarra was commissioned by Victor Amadeus II to build a church dedicated to Saint Hubertus, patron of hunters. The grandiose baroque church was built between 1716 and 1729 and presents a Greek-cross plan with an octagonal core, and houses a large high altar inside, two side altars, and four side chapels located diagonally. Due to the church's position within the palace complex, it was impossible to build a dome. It was instead simulated with a trompe-l'œil painted on the vaulting by Giovanni Antonio Galliari. Juvarra decided to push the façade back in relation to the Grand Gallery, in order to create a parvise in front of the church.

Inside, the entablature is supported by tall lesenes topped with Corinthian capitals. The sculptural program, built between 1724 and 1729, is the work of Giovanni Baratta and his nephew Giovanni Antonio Cybei. It features tribunes on the upper level, that were used by the monarch and the royal court when attending mass. the large high altar, decorated with flying angels supporting a ciborium in the shape of a small temple, and the four statues of the doctors of the church: St. Augustine, St. Ambrose, St. Athanasius and St. John Chrysostom around the central nave. The pictorial program, centred on the figure of the Virgin Mary and associated saints, is presented on the paintings placed on the side altars and in the chapels, works by Francesco Trevisani, Sebastiano Ricci and Sebastiano Conca. The upper level of the church houses tribunes The baptismal font is located in the chapel to the left of the entrance. The connections of the church with the royal palace were completed under Charles Emmanuel III by Benedetto Alfieri, who also designed the monumental staircase that gives access to the upper tribune and the tunnel connecting the chapel with the Citroniera. After the period of abandonment of the palace, the chapel underwent a minor renovation in 1961 on the occasion of the 1961 Italian Expo, and then a complete renovation with the rest of the palace in 1999. Its opening to the public was celebrated on 3 September 2006 with a concert.

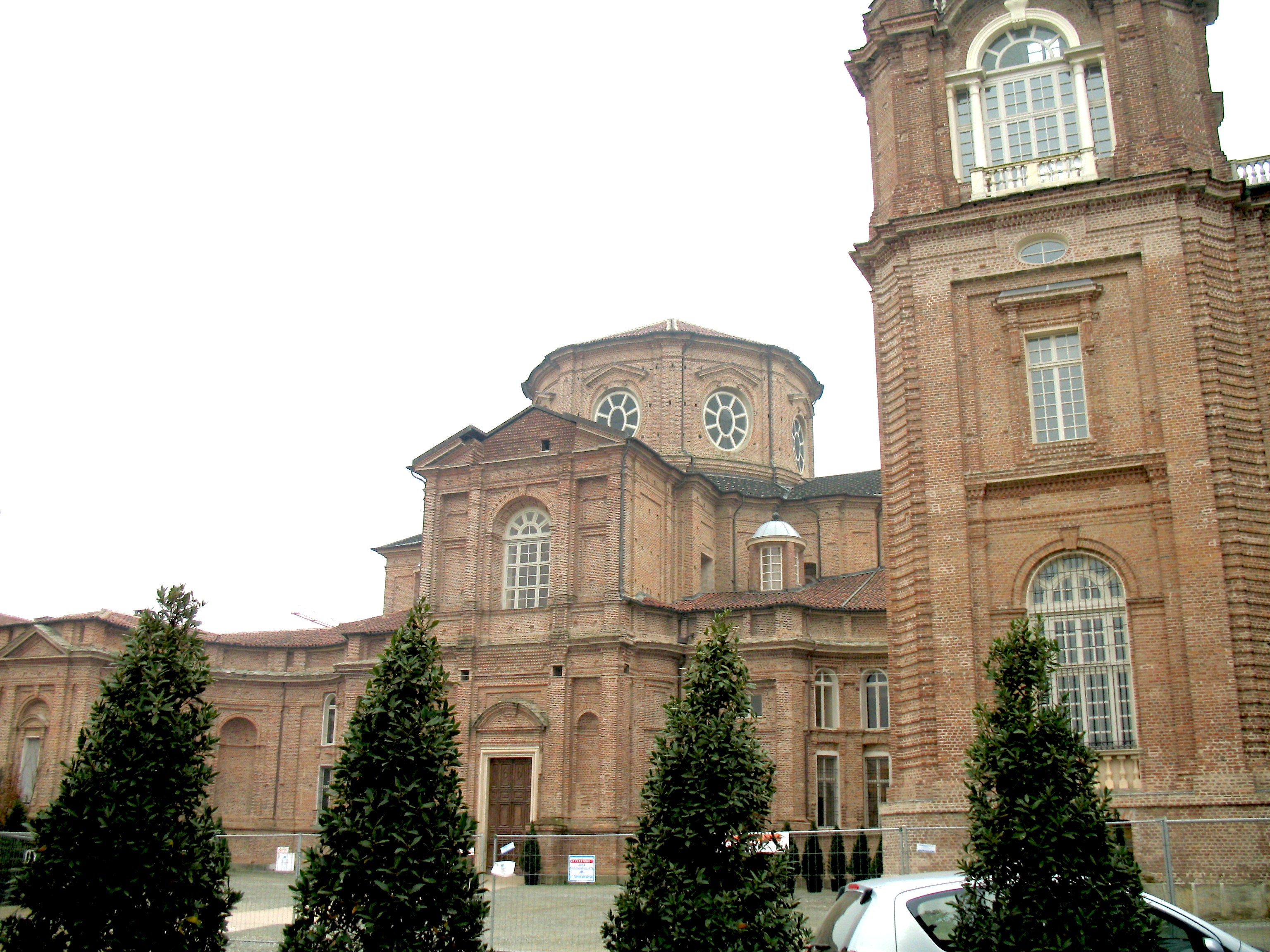
The exterior and main façade of the church

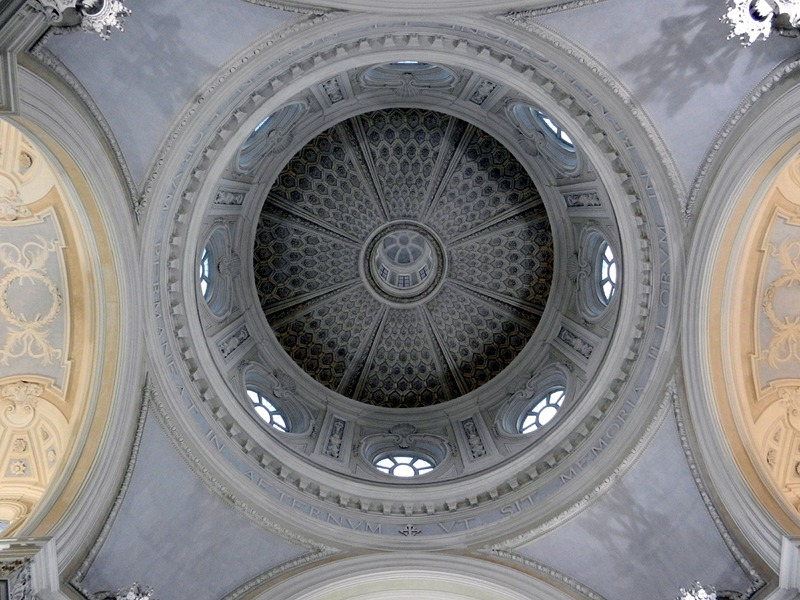
The Trompe-l'œil mimicking the dome

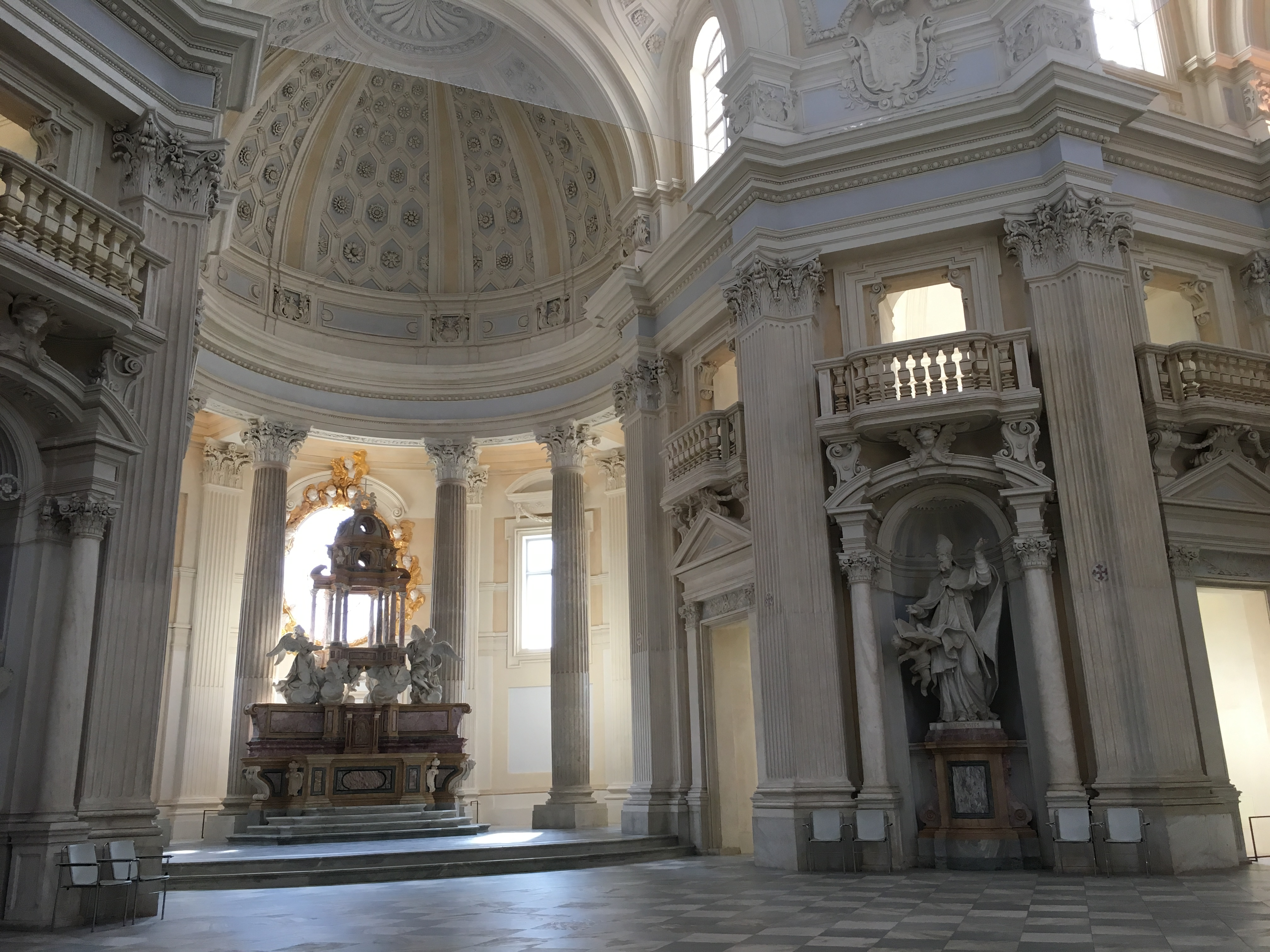
Interior of the chapel

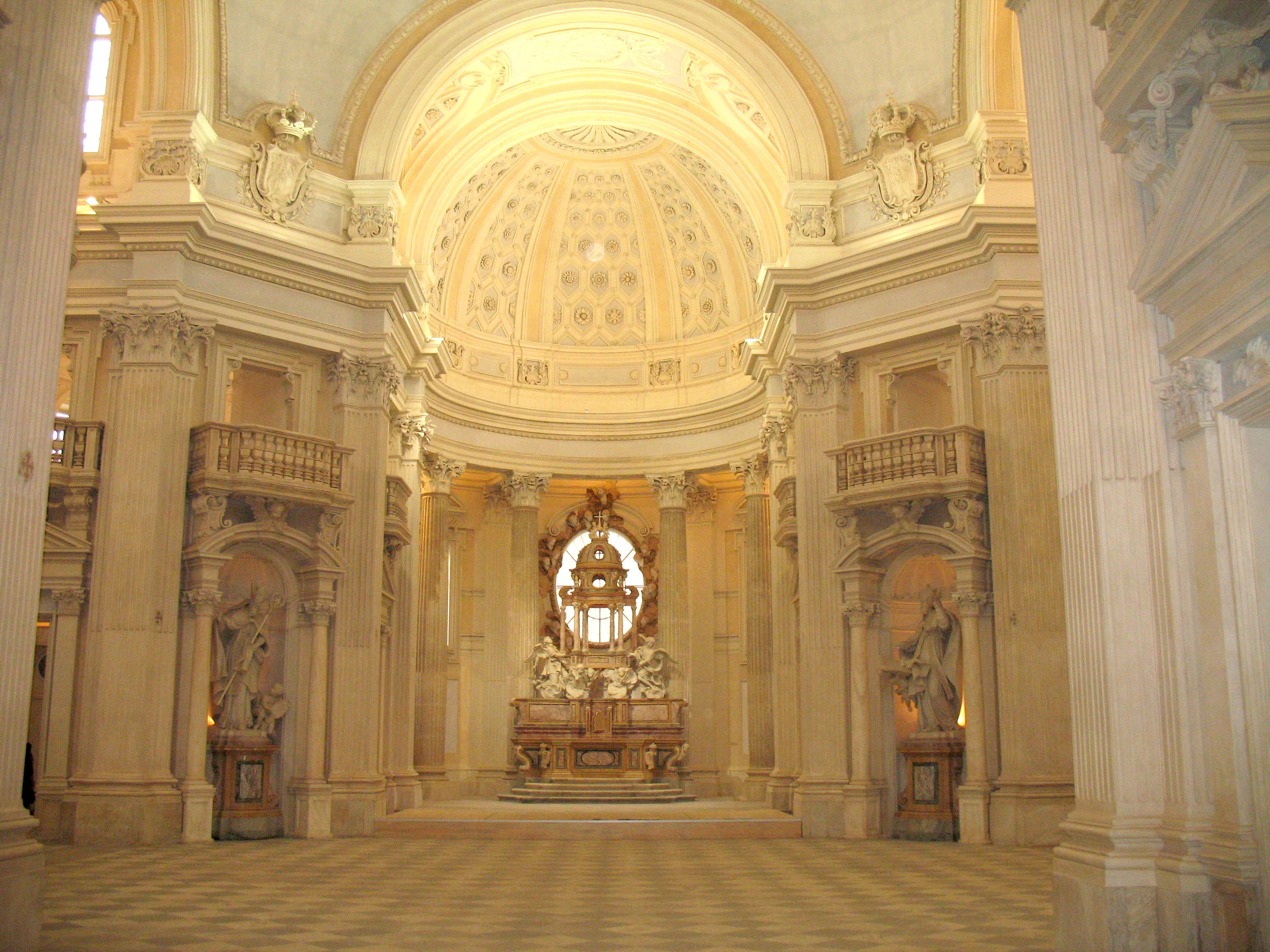
The central space
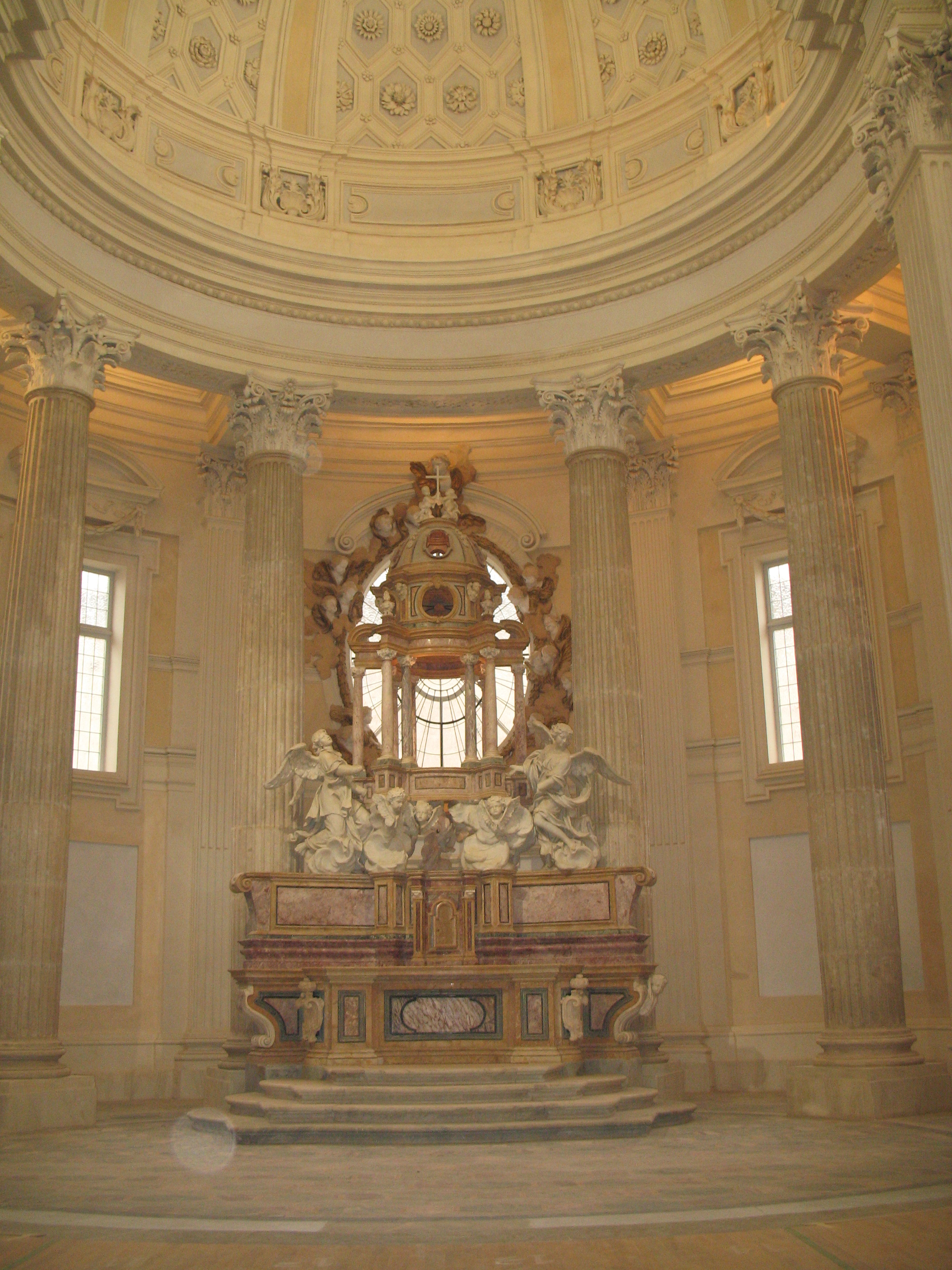
The main altar

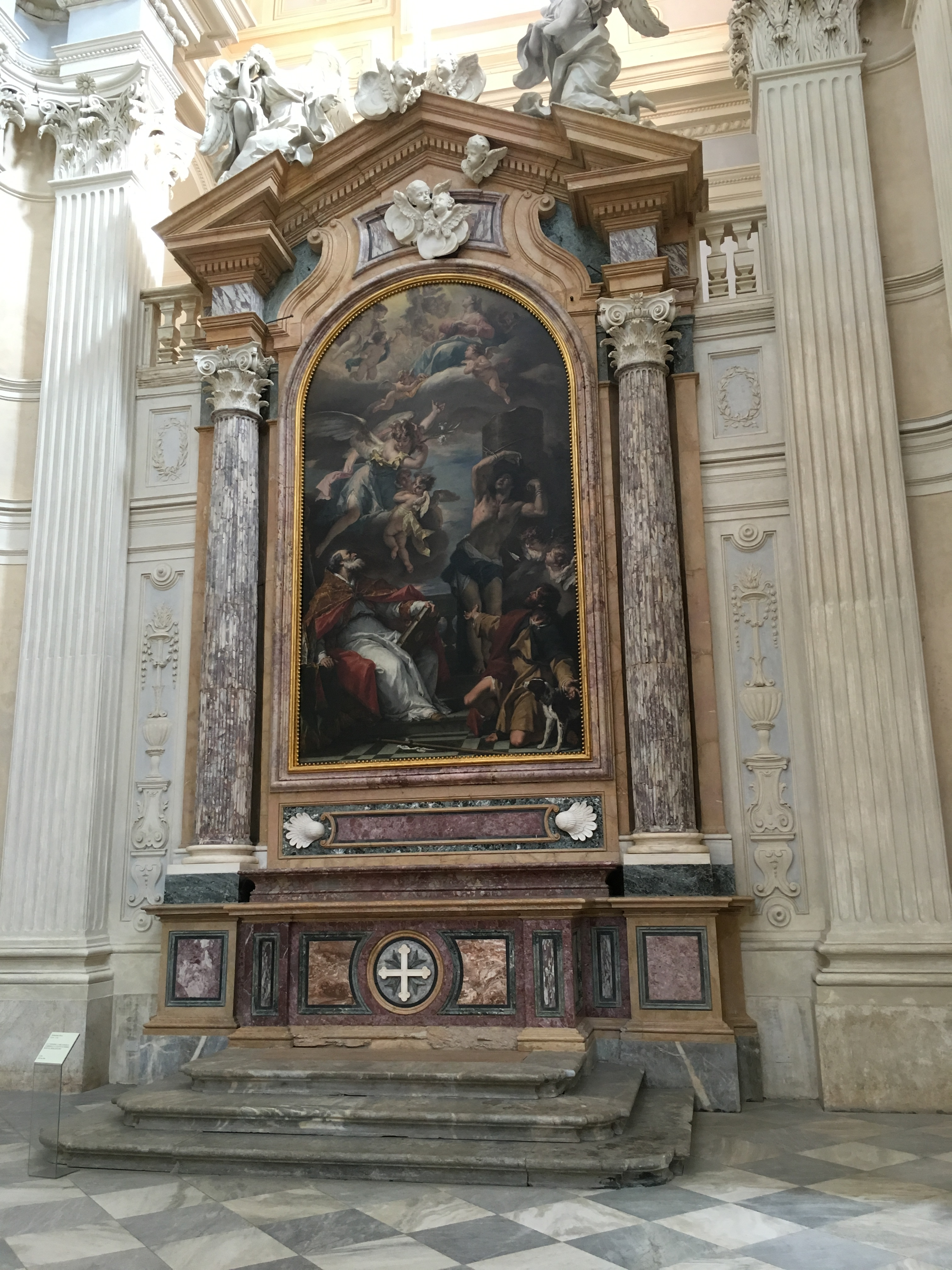
A side altar

== Gallery ==
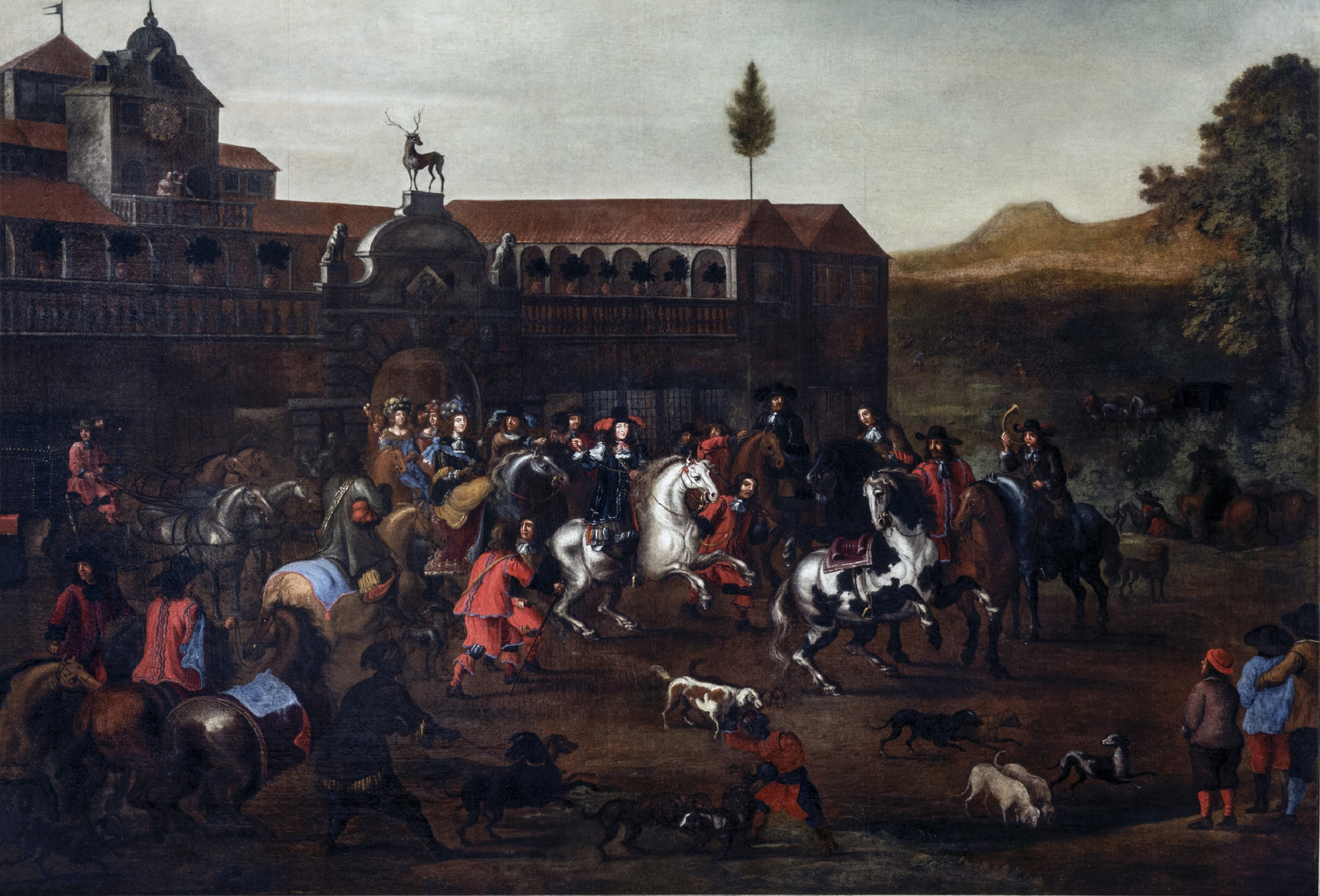
The Court's departure for the hunt from the Venaria Reale by Melchior Hamers, 1668

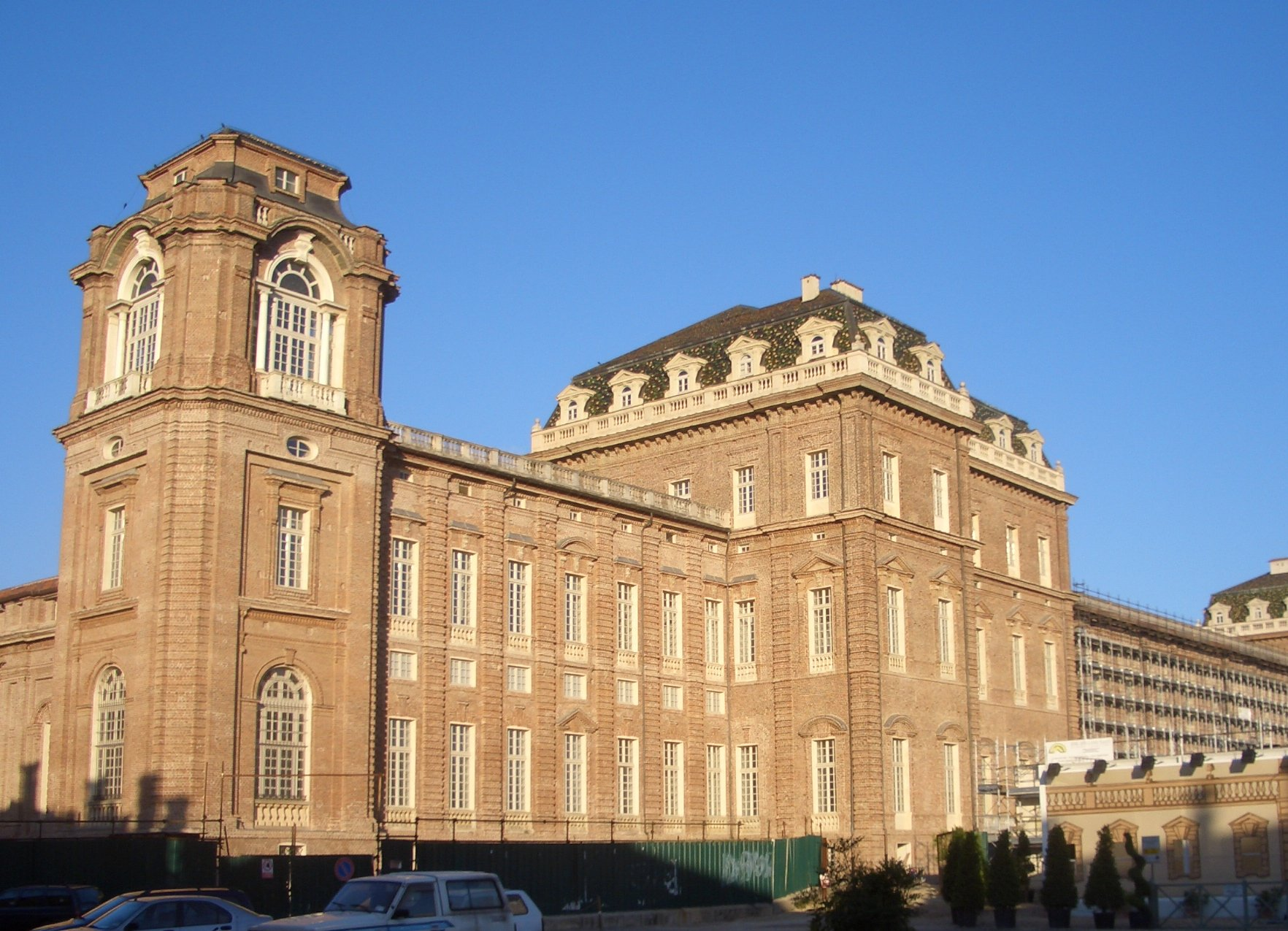
The Belvedere and the Garove Pavilion

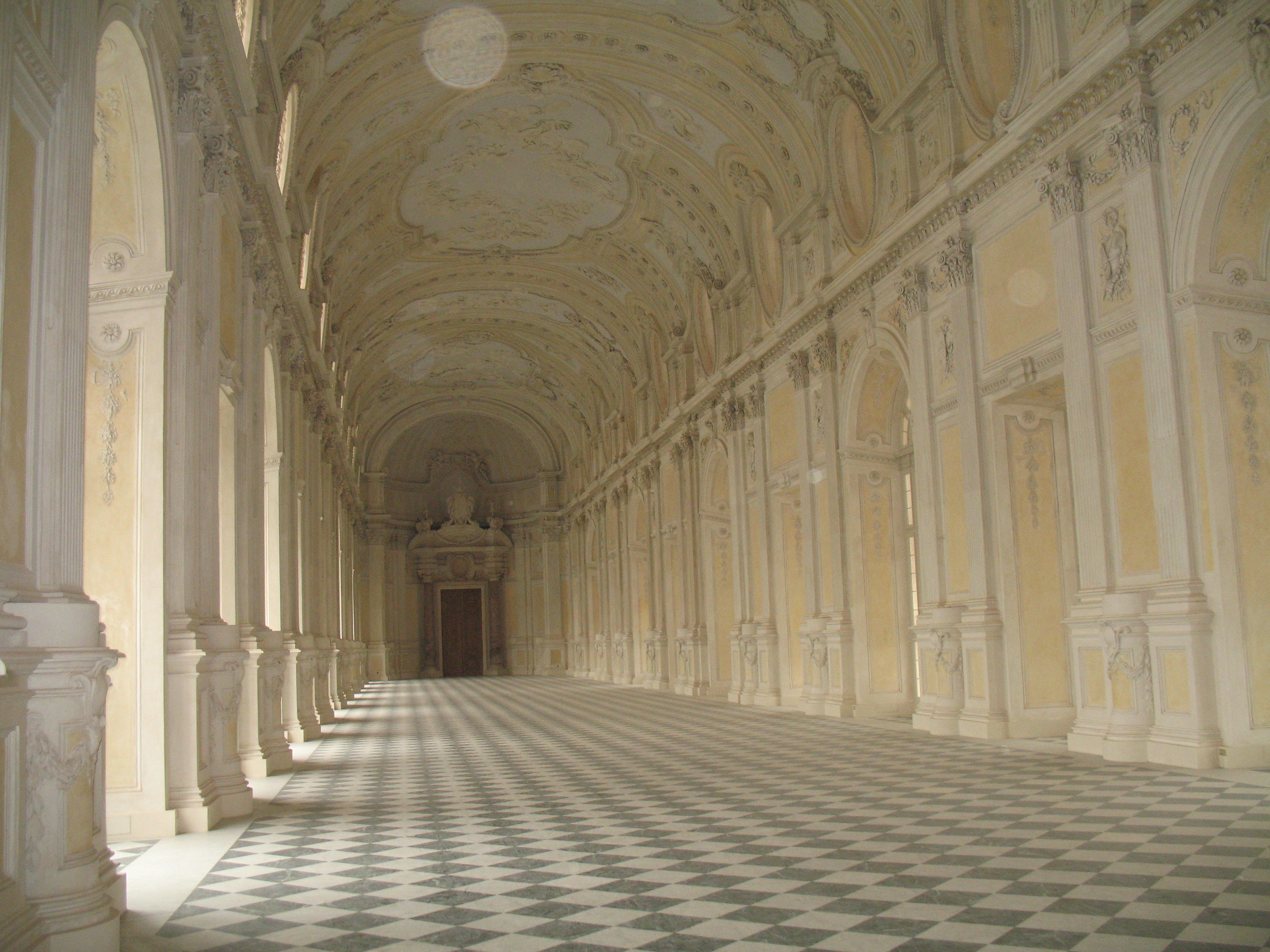
Galleria Grande (erroneously known as "Diana's Gallery")

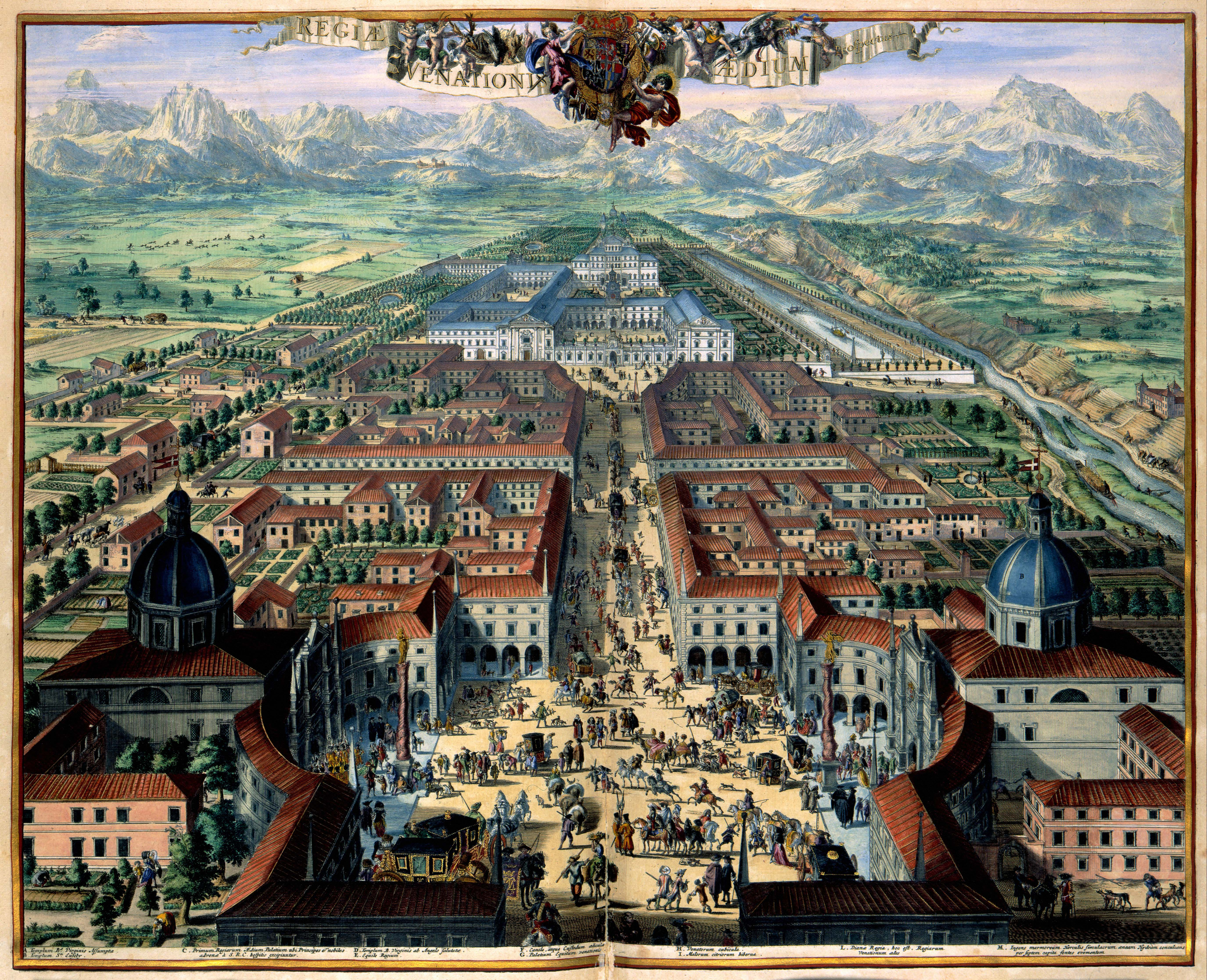
View of the town and the palace in the late 17th century)

== See also ==
- List of Baroque residences
- Lux (album) – a 2012 album by Brian Eno which was initially a soundtrack for the Grand Gallery

== Sources ==
- Merlini, Carlo. Ambienti e Figure di Torino Vecchia. Turin: Tipografia Rattero.
- Vinardi, Maria Grazia (2022). "La Venaria Reale". In Ricuperati, Giuseppe (ed.). Storia di Torino (in Italian). Einaudi. p. 463-481. ISBN 9788806162115.
