= Villa della Regina =

UNESCO World Heritage Site
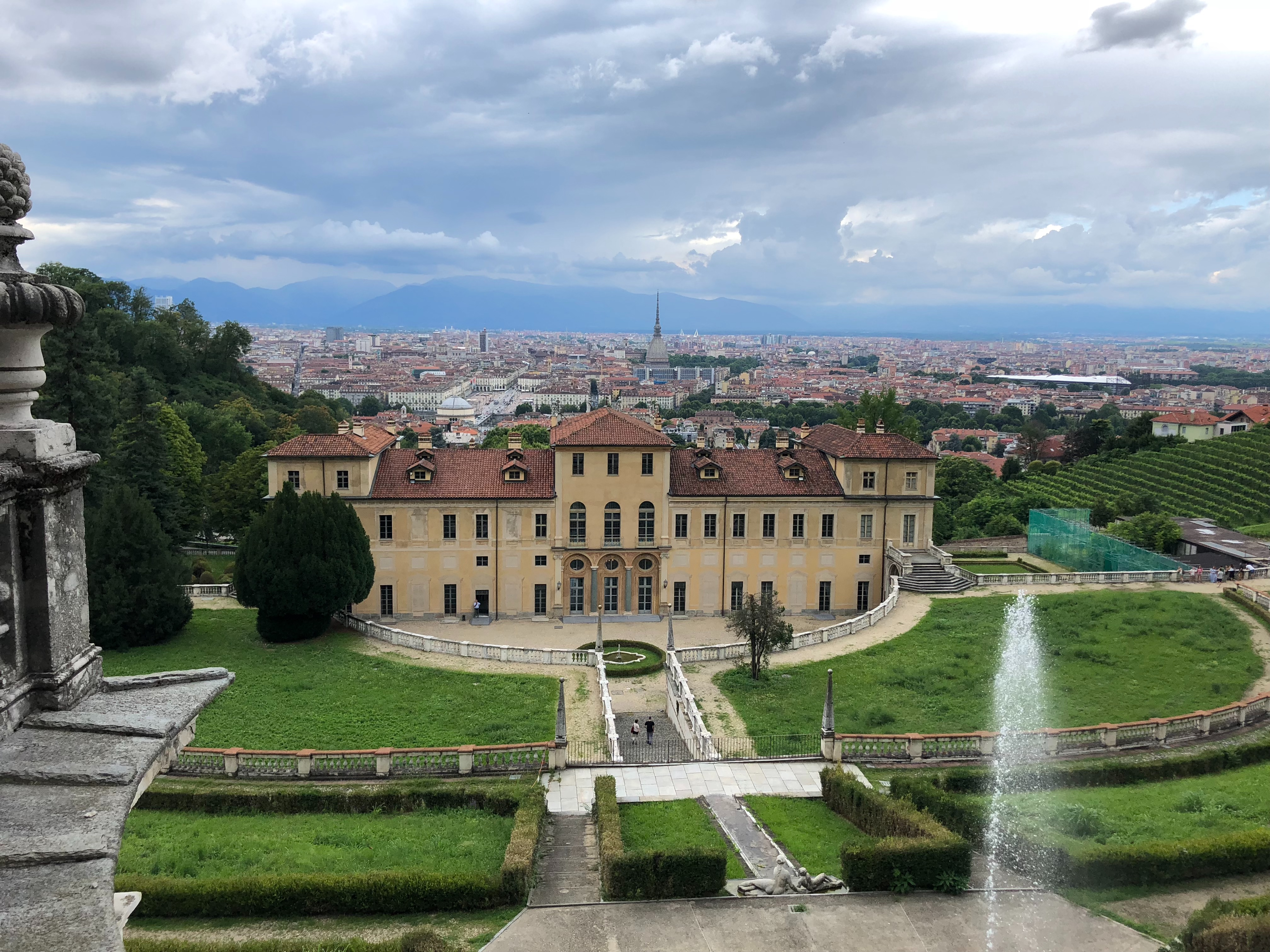

- Location within Turin Location within Piedmont
- Location: Turin, Piedmont, Italy
- Part of: Residences of the Royal House of Savoy
- Criteria: Cultural: (i)(ii)(iv)(v)
- Reference: 823bis-003
- Inscription: 1997 (21st Session)
- Extensions: 2010
- Area: 12.03 ha (29.7 acres)
- Buffer zone: 7.3 ha (18 acres)
- Coordinates: 45°3′32.4″N 7°42′23.0″E

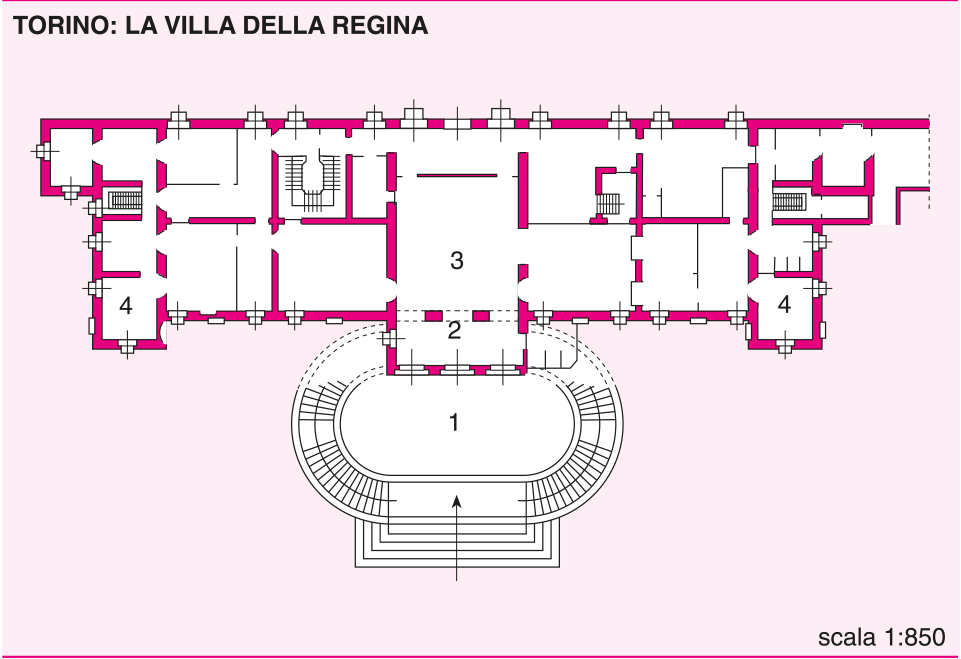
Plan of the palace

The Villa della Regina is a once semi-rural palace, now surrounded by the city of Turin, Piedmont, Italy. It is located at Strada Santa Margherita #79 in the eastern sector of the city, in the quarter of Borgo Po. It was originally built by the House of Savoy in the 17th century.

In 1997, it was placed on the UNESCO World Heritage Site list along with 13 other residences of the House of Savoy.

== History ==
The original structure was designed in early 1615 by the Italian soldier, architect and military engineer, Ascanio Vitozzi. When he died in 1615, the project passed to his collaborators, father and son Carlo and Amedeo di Castellamonte. The original building was commissioned for the Prince-Cardinal Maurice of Savoy during the reign of his brother Victor Amadeus I, Duke of Savoy. The private villa was graced with its own vineyard and later associated with women of the House of Savoy, hence it was also called the Vigna di Madama. In 1637, when Victor Amadeus died, a succession crisis ensued pitting the claims of the former duke's brothers, Maurice and Thomas Prince of Carignano against those of his young children, under the regency of Victor's widow, Christine Marie of France. Ultimately Christine and her French alliance forced Thomas into exile, and Maurice into compliant assent. Maurice resigned his appointment as a cardinal, accepted an appointment as governor of Nice, and in 1642 the 49 year old married Christine's putatively illegitimate 14 year old daughter Louise Christine of Savoy. Maurice died in this villa in 1657, and his wife inherited it along with its large art collection. Lacking offspring, in 1692 she deeded the property to her niece, Anne Marie d'Orléans who in 1684 had married King Victor Amadeus II of Savoy in 1684. Anne Marie was also niece of King Louis XIV of France.

She used the Vigna when she could. She engaged the court architect Filippo Juvarra to refurbish the house and gardens. The palace was divided into apartments for the king and for the queen. Ceilings were frescoed by Claudio Francesco Belmont. Most of the present frescoed décor of the Vigna is from her lifetime. Her husband was the King of Sicily from 1713 until 1720 when he exchanged Sicily with Sardinia. From then on, the building was known as Villa della Regina ("Villa of the Queen"). It was here Anne Marie died in 1728. Anne Marie's eldest daughter Maria Adelaide came here and tried to recreate a Ménagerie similar to that of Versailles.

Polyxena of Hesse-Rotenburg, daughter-in-law of Anne Marie, did some work in the main saloon of the building when she became the owner of the villa in 1728 at the death of Anne Marie. From the 1730s onward, the refurbishment was completed by Juvarra's pupil Giovanni Pietro Baroni of Tavigliano. Under his direction the impressive entrance hall frescoed quadratura and panels were completed by Giovanni Battista Crosato, Daniel Seyter and Corrado Giaquinto in the main room, with grotesques by Filippo Minei and paintings by the brothers Domenico and Giuseppe Valeriani. There are also precious chinoiserie Cabinets in lacquer and golden wood. In the park there is the Pavilion of the Solinghi, a pagoda building in which the Academy of the Solinghi used to meet; it was a group of intellectuals founded by the Cardinal Maurice.

The Villa was later used by the Spanish Queen of Sardinia Maria Antonietta Ferdinanda. It remained the property of the House of Savoy until 1868 when it was donated by Victor Emmanuel II of Italy to the Institute of the Army's Daughters and in 1994 it was given to the State domain. Many furnishings were moved to Rome, others were lost to theft or bombing during the Second World War, it is today open to the public in order to fund its maintenance. The canvases by Giaquinto depicting Story of Aeneas were moved to the Quirinal palace in Rome.
