= Domenico Olivieri =

Domenico Olivieri may refer to:

- Domenico Olivieri (painter) (1679-1755), Italian painter
- Domenico Olivieri (footballer) (born 1968), Belgian footballer and football manager
