= Castellamonte Castle =

Castle in Piedmont, Italy

- Castello di Castellamonte
- Castellamonte, Piedmont, Italy
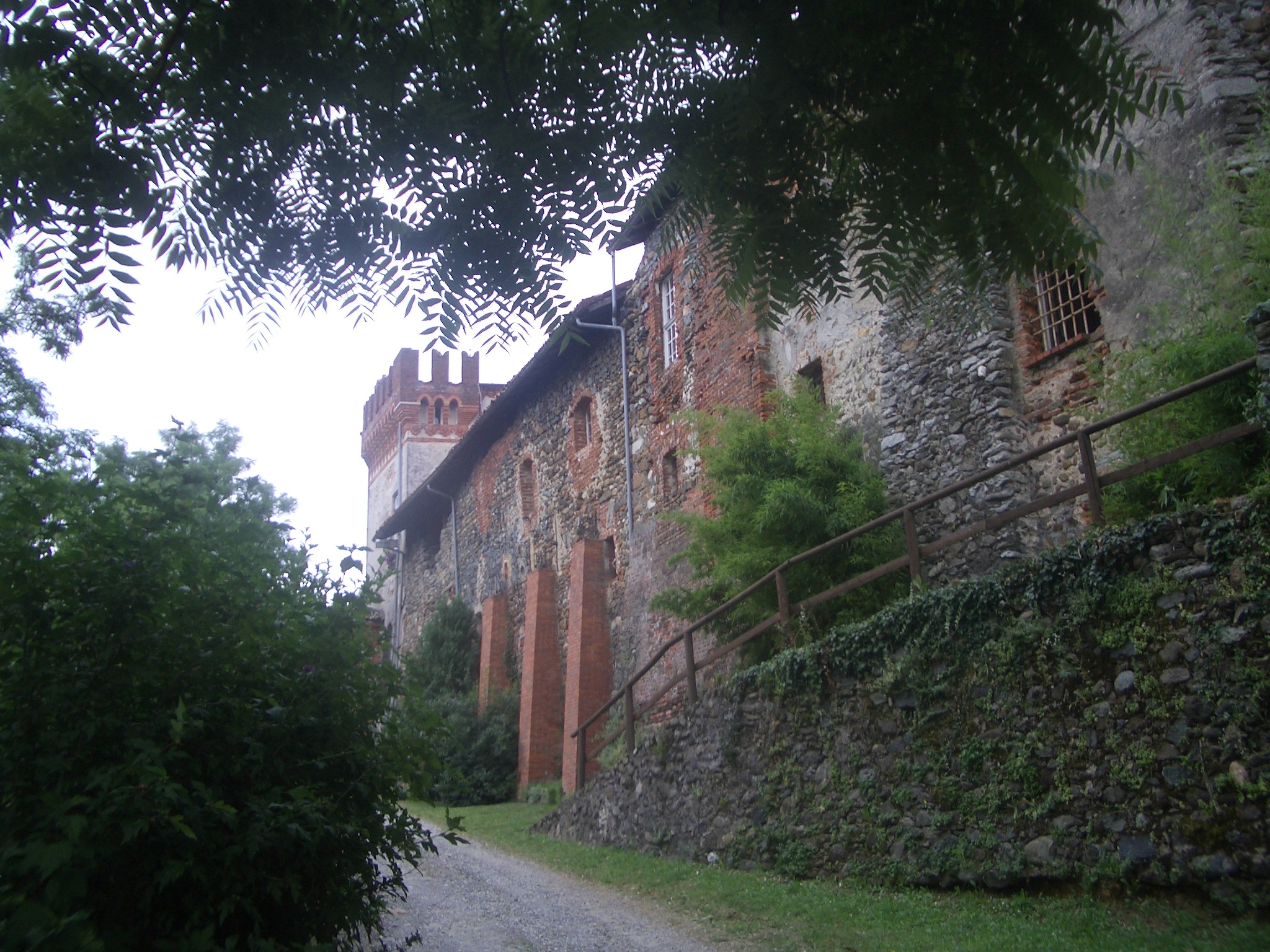
- Castellamonte Castle in 2009

Site information
- Type: Castle

Location
- Location in Italy
- Coordinates: 45°23′09.02″N 7°42′42.85″E

Castellamonte Castle (Italian: Castello di Castellamonte) is a castle located in Castellamonte, Piedmont, Italy.

== History ==
The original medieval structure was largely destroyed during the Tuchini revolt in the late 14th century. Later, the castle underwent significant renovations, particularly under Counts Carlo and Amedeo Cognengo in the early 1600s, who are credited with acting on the section now known as Palazzo Bianco and adding the small chapel that forms part of the complex. In the late 19th century, architect Luigi Formento designed the eastern red-brick wing adorned with Ghibelline battlements known as Torre Rossa, reflecting the medieval revival style of that time.

== Description ==
There are, from the terracotta-balustraded courtyard, views of the Canavese region, from the Ligurian-Piedmont Apennines, over the hills of Turin, to the Monviso and the mountains of Val di Susa and Lanzo, extending to the Gran Paradiso peaks.
