= Santa Cristina, Turin =

Church of Santa Cristina
- Chiesa di Santa Cristina
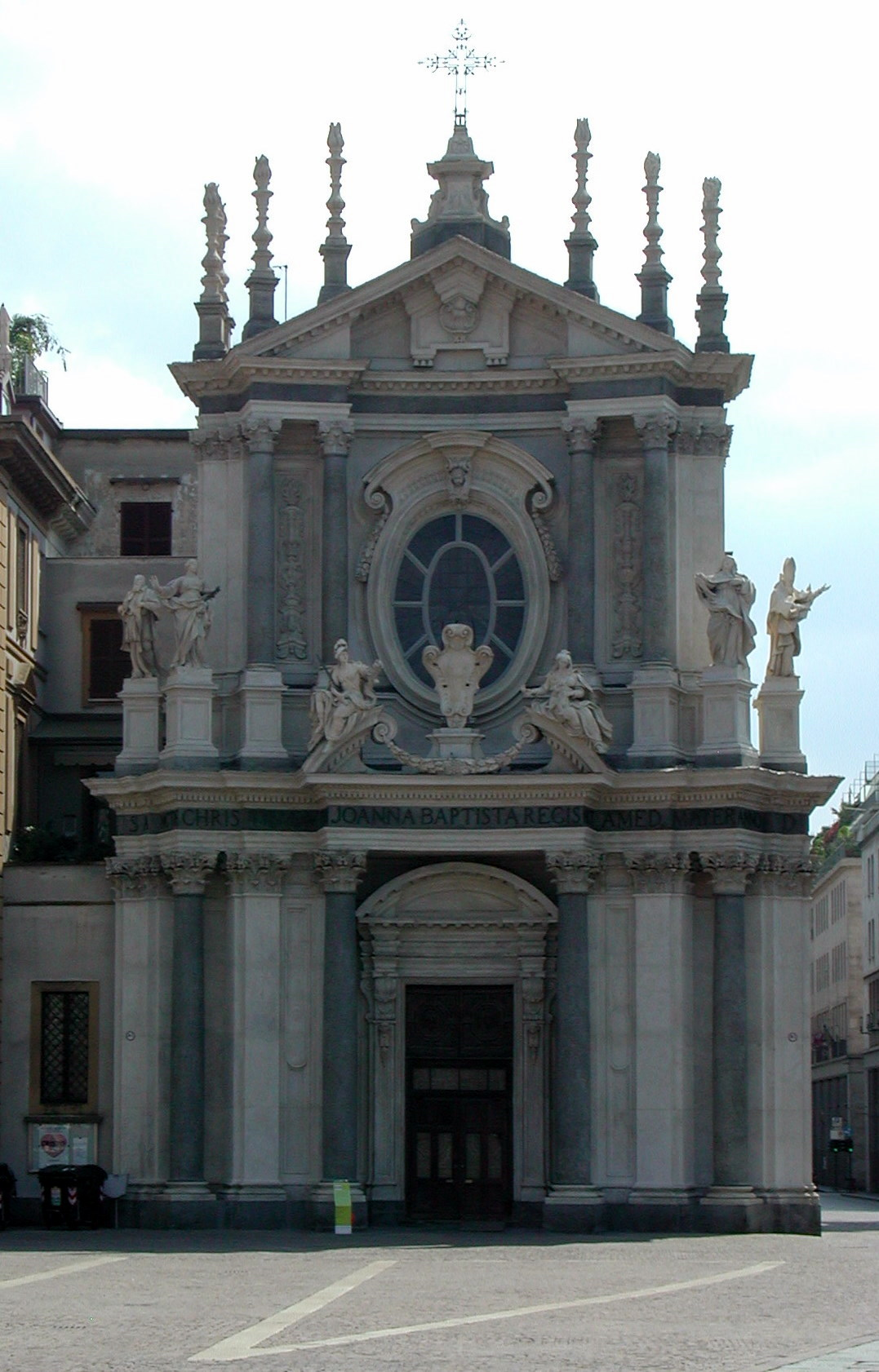
- Façade of the church

- Map of Turin
- 45.0669°N 7.6822°E
- Country: Italy
- Denomination: Roman Catholic Church

History
- Dedication: Christina of Bolsena

Architecture
- Architect(s): Carlo di Castellamonte, Amedeo di Castellamonte, Filippo Juvarra (façade)
- Style: Baroque
- Groundbreaking: 1640

Administration
- Archdiocese: Turin

Santa Cristina is a Baroque style, Roman Catholic church located in Turin, region of Piedmont, Italy. It mirrors the adjacent church of San Carlo and faces the Piazza San Carlo. The arrangement recalls the twin churches (chiese gemelle) of Santa Maria dei Miracoli (1681) and Santa Maria in Montesanto (1679) facing the Piazza del Popolo in Rome.

== History ==
The original layout was designed in 1620 by the architect Carlo di Castellamonte, and construction pursued until 1639. The project was only completed between 1715 and 1718, under the guidance of Filippo Juvarra, including the facade elaborately decorated with ovals and details with statues of saints and allegories of the virtues. The adjacent convent housed nuns of the Order of the Discalced Carmelites. In 1802, the order was suppressed in Turin by Napoleonic forces. The interiors were modified in the 19th century and after the bombardments of World War II.
