= Castellamonte =

- Comune
- Città di Castellamonte
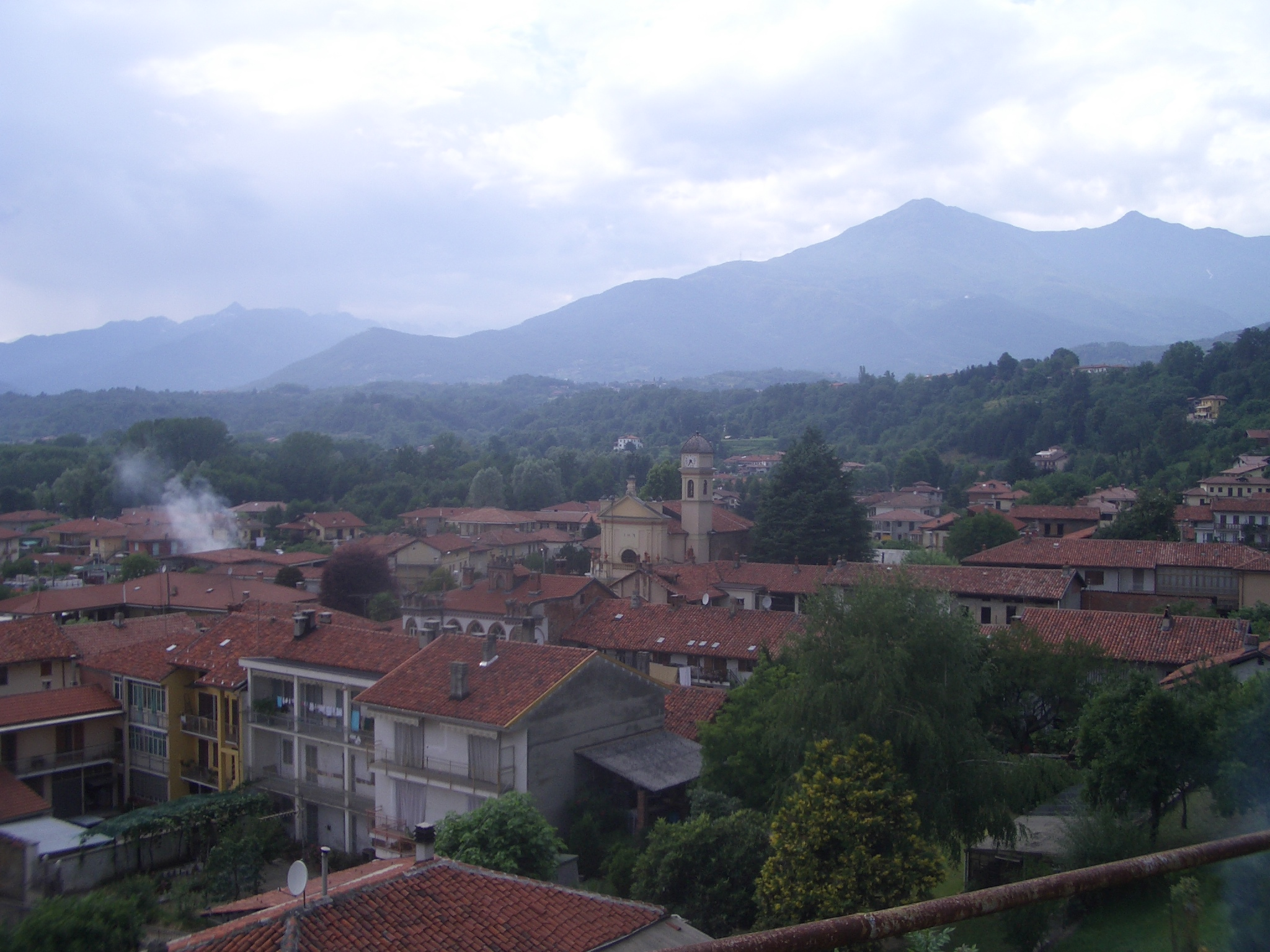
- Panorama with the church of S. Rocco.

- Coat of arms

- Location within Italy Location within Piedmont
- Coordinates: 45°22′N 7°43′E
- Country: Italy
- Region: Piedmont
- Metropolitan city: Turin (TO)
- Frazioni: Campo, Filia, Muriaglio, Preparetto, San Giovanni, Sant'Anna Boschi, Sant'Antonio, Spineto

Government
  - Mayor: Pasquale Mazza

Area
  - Total: 38.71 km^{2} (14.95 sq mi)
- Elevation: 343 m (1,125 ft)

Population (31 August 2021)
  - Total: 9,789
  - Density: 252.9/km^{2} (655.0/sq mi)
- Demonym: Castellamontese(i)
- Time zone: UTC+1 (CET)
  - Summer (DST): UTC+2 (CEST)
- Postal code: 10081
- Dialing code: 0124
- Website: Official website

Castellamonte is a comune (municipality) in the Metropolitan City of Turin in the Italian region Piedmont, located about 35 kilometres (22 mi) north of Turin.

It is located in the Canavese, at the feet of a hill surmounted by a 14th-century castle, hence the name (meaning "Castle at the Mount"). Only traces remain of the latter's original structure, what is visible now dating to an 18th-century renovation. The town is also home to an unfinished rotunda designed by Alessandro Antonelli, the Baroque church of San Rocco; the Sacro Monte di Belmonte is not far, though in the communal territory of Valperga.

Architects Carlo and Amedeo di Castellamonte were born in the town.
