= Domenico Olivieri (painter) =

Italian painter (1679–1755)

Domenico Olivieri or Olivero (1679 in Turin – 1755 in Turin) was an Italian painter, who painted genre scenes influenced by the Flemish Bamboccianti painters.

== Biography ==
He particularly excelled in painting droll scenes, fairs, and merry-makings. In the gallery of the court of Turin were two of his best pictures, in one of which he has represented a fair, with an immense assemblage of figures, of quack-doctors, and groups of peasants, sporting or quarrelling.

He also painted The Miracle of the Sacrament for the sacristy of the church of Corpus Domini, Turin.

Luigi Lanzi said of Olivieri that he was born to amuse others with personal ridicule, with witty sayings, with facetious paintings. They are very famous in the collections of the Piedmont with his witty caricatures following the style of Pieter van Laer and other talented Flemish painters.

Boni says that he had a pupil, Giovanni Michele Graneri, who painted in the same style.
