= Basilica of Corpus Domini =

- Basilica del Corpus Domini
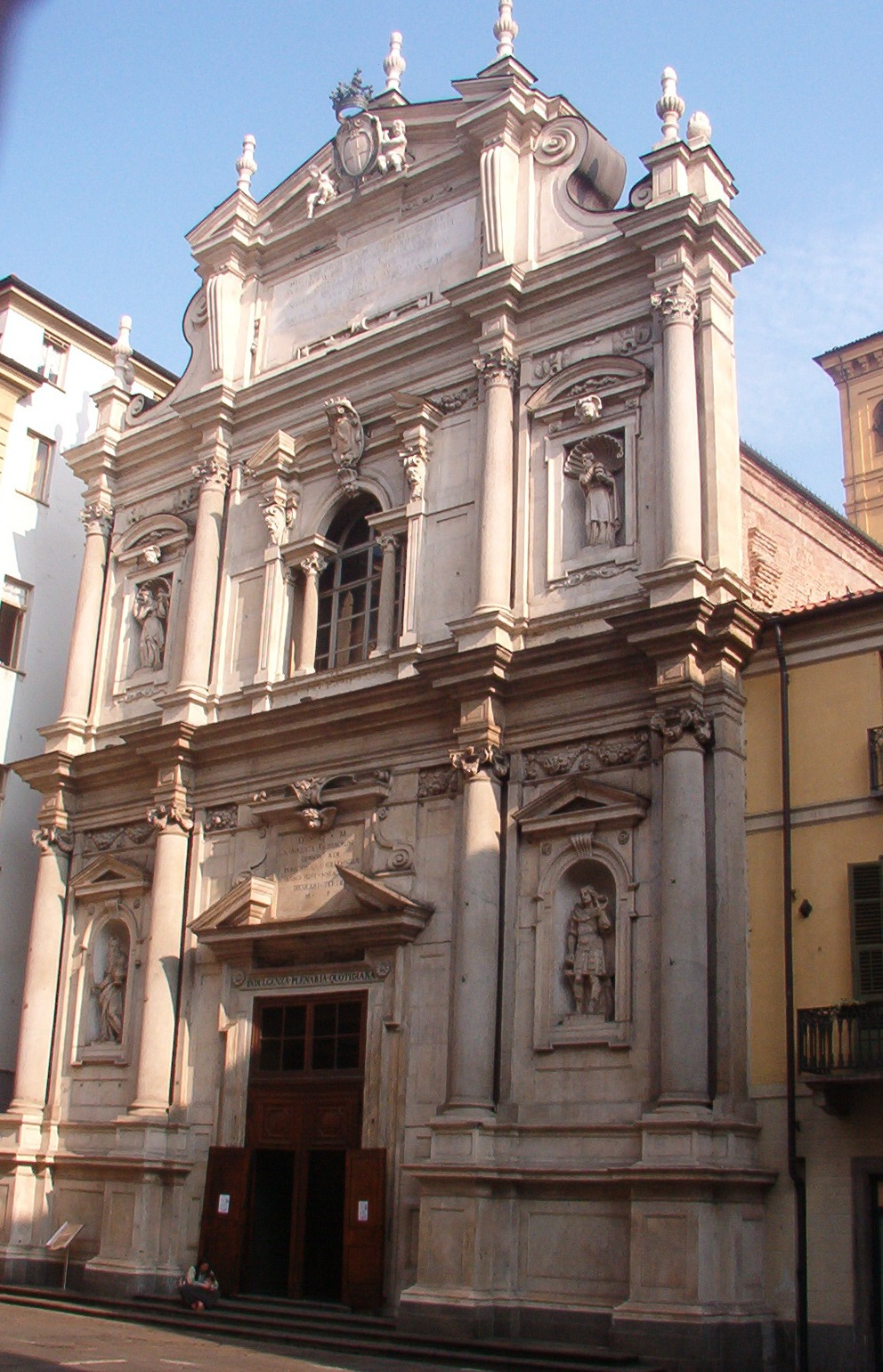
- Façade of the basilica

- Map of Turin
- 45.0728°N 7.68278°E
- Country: Italy
- Denomination: Roman Catholic Church

Architecture
- Style: Baroque
- Groundbreaking: 1607

Administration
- Archdiocese: Turin

The Basilica of Corpus Domini (Italian: Basilica del Corpus Domini) is a Roman Catholic church in Turin, Italy, built to celebrate the "Miracle of the Eucharist" which, according to various sources, occurred in 1453 during the war between the Duchy of Savoy and France.

== History ==
The event which led to the construction of the church occurred on 6 June 1453 during the war between Louis of Savoy and France. A group of French soldiers had plundered the main church in Exilles, a town in the Val di Susa. On 6 June, the day of the Feast of Corpus Christi, they went to Turin to sell the booty. The donkey which transported the sacramental bread from the Exilles' church fell on the ground and the Holy Spirit rose and illuminated the square from the air.

To celebrate the event, the painting of the Holy Name of Jesus was painted on the four gates of the city but this was deemed insufficient, and in 1509 a small chapel was soon commissioned on the present church's site. However, nothing was built until 1521, when Innocenzo Cybo, Archbishop of Turin, ordered the construction of a small oratory by Matteo Sanmicheli. This was demolished in 1607 to make room to the modern basilica.

The design of the new church was commissioned to Ascanio Vitozzi. Amedeo di Castellamonte collaborated in the designing of the façade. Works began in 1607. In 1753 king Charles Emmanuel III of Savoy commissioned Benedetto Alfieri to restore the interior decoration and to ornament it with stuccoes.

== Overview ==
The church has a massive façade, with six pilasters and four columns supporting the entablature, in typical Baroque style. It is completed by statue of angels and saints by Bernardo Falconi, dating to the late 17th century.

The interior has a single nave, and was largely renewed in the 18th century. The high altar is the original one, created by Francesco Lanfranchi in 1664. The interior also houses a slab marking the exact place of the miracle.
