= Royal Palace of Turin =

- Palazzo Reale di Torino
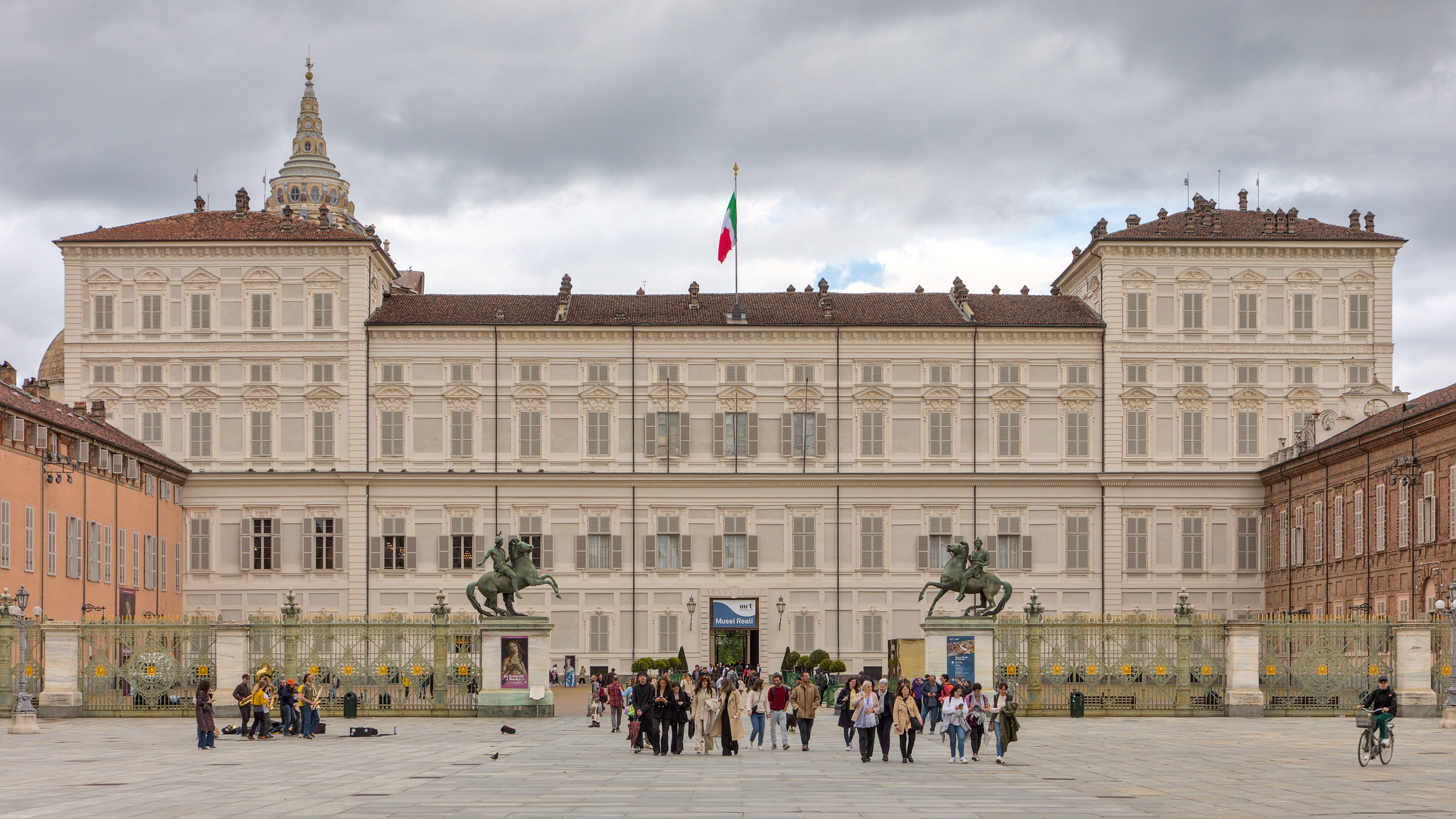
- The façade (1646–1660). The top of the dome of the Chapel of the Holy Shroud is visible on the left.

- Location within Turin

General information
- Architectural style: Baroque, Neoclassical
- Location: Piazzetta Reale 1, Turin, Italy
- Coordinates: 45.0727°N 7.686°E
- Groundbreaking: 1645

Design and construction
- Architects: Ascanio Vittozzi, Carlo and Amedeo di Castellamonte, Filippo Juvarra, Benedetto Alfieri, Pelagio Palagi.

Website
- Musei Reali Torino

UNESCO World Heritage Site
- Criteria: Cultural: i, ii, iv, v
- Reference: 823
- Inscription: 1997 (21st Session)

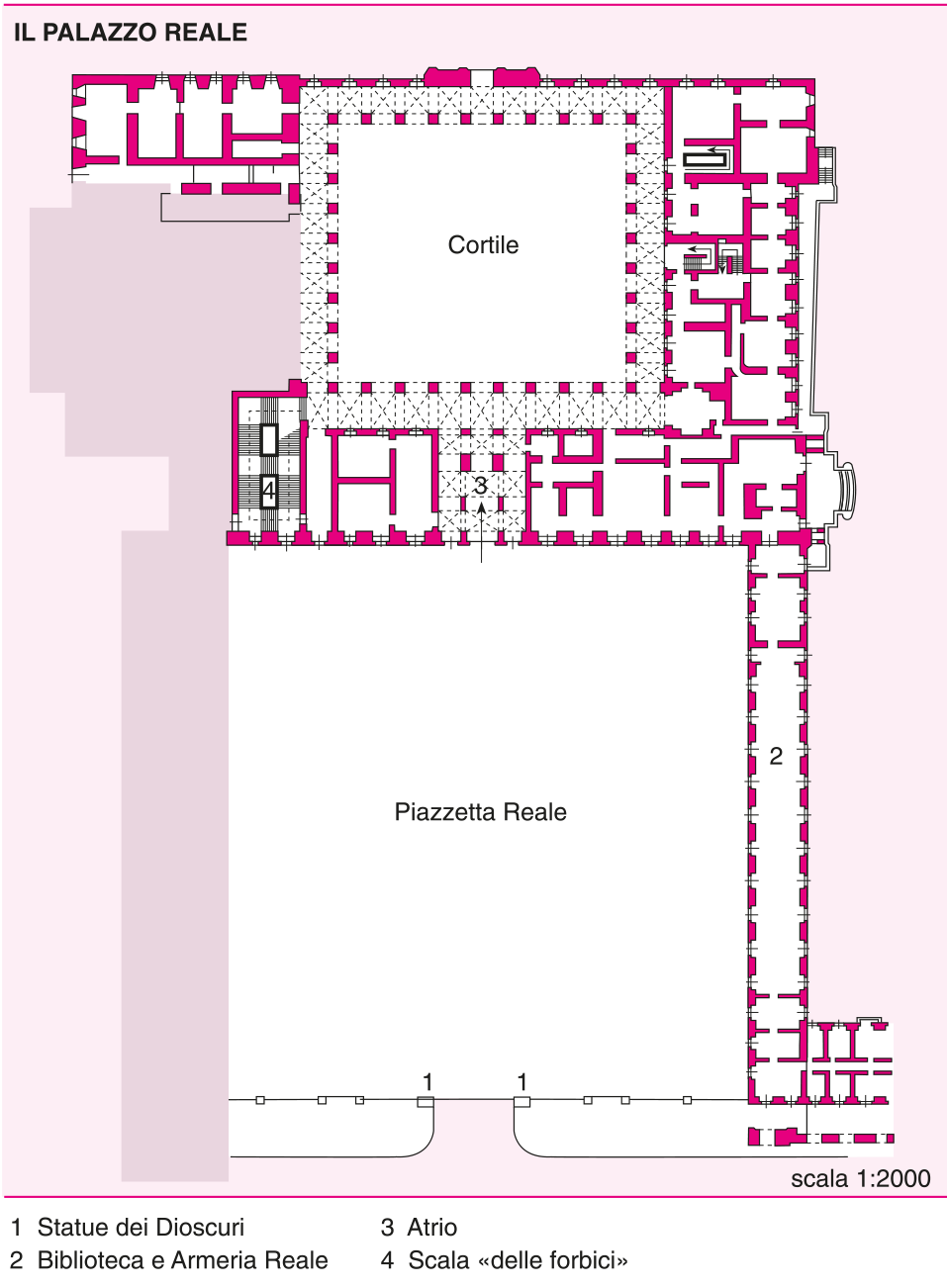
Turin. Royal Palace. (1) Statues of the Dioscuri. (2) Royal Library and Armoury. (3) Atrium. (4) “Scissors” staircase.

The Royal Palace of Turin (Italian: Palazzo Reale di Torino) is a historic palace of the House of Savoy in the city of Turin in Northern Italy. It was originally built in the 16th century and was later modernized by Christine Marie of France (1606–1663) in the 17th century, with designs by the Baroque architect Filippo Juvarra. The palace also includes the Palazzo Chiablese and the Chapel of the Holy Shroud, the latter of which was built to house the famous Shroud of Turin.

In 1946, the building became the property of the state and was turned into a museum. In 1997, it was placed on the UNESCO World Heritage Site list along with 13 other residences of the House of Savoy.

== History ==
Construction of the palace was ordered by the Regent Christine Marie in 1645. She wanted a new residence for the court after her son returned from the civil war.

The chosen location was the previous Bishop's Palace, which had been built in the middle of the new capital of Savoy, Turin, during the reign of Emmanuel Philibert, Duke of Savoy (1528–1580). Its advantages included an open and sunny position, in addition to being close to other buildings where the court met. The Duke was able to monitor the two entrances of the city (the Palatine and the Pretoria gates) from the Bishop's Palace. The Bishop's Palace in Turin was later captured by the French in 1536 and served as a residence of the French Viceroys of Savoy, who were appointed by Francis I of France. Opposite the Bishop's Palace was the Palazzo Vecchio or the Palazzo di San Giovanni. This building, disparagingly known as Pasta con Tonno (English: Pasta with tuna) because of its architecture, was later replaced by the grand Ducal Palace.

Thus the old Bishop's Palace became the seat of power and was greatly expanded by Emmanuel Philibert to house his ever-growing collection of art, animals, marbles, and furniture. Emmanuel Philibert died in Turin in August 1580 and the Savoyard throne was handed down to his son, Charles Emmanuel I, Duke of Savoy (1562–1630). In celebration of the joint marriages of his daughters Princess Margaret and Princess Isabella in 1608, Charles Emmanuel I commissioned the construction of a ring of porches topped off by an open gallery. His son, the future Victor Amadeus I, Duke of Savoy (1587–1637), entered into a prestigious marriage when he married the French Princess Christine Marie of France. Their marriage took place in Paris at the Louvre Palace in 1619.

Victor Amadeus I succeeded to the Duchy of Savoy in 1630. He had previously spent his youth in Madrid at the court of his grandfather, Philip II of Spain. His wife set the tone for Victor Amadeus I's reign. Christine Marie had the court moved from the ducal palace in Turin to the Castello del Valentino, which at that time, was on the outskirts of the small capital. Many of Victor Amadeus I and Christine Marie's children were born at Valentino, including Francis Hyacinth, Duke of Savoy and his successor Charles Emmanuel II, Duke of Savoy. Christine Marie became the regent of Savoy after the death of her husband in 1637 on behalf of her two sons, who succeeded as dukes of Savoy.

From 1660 to 1663, Bartolomeo Caravoglia worked on the new decoration of the Royal Palace, where he produced some paintings for the Sala delle Principesse, based on an iconographic plan conceived by Emanuele Tesauro to celebrate the marriages of members of the House of Savoy to foreign consorts.

During the reign of Victor Amadeus II, the Daniel gallery was created and named after Daniel Seiter, who painted the lavish murals seen there. Victor Amadeus II also had a collection of summer apartments built to look onto the court and a winter apartment overlooking the gardens. His wife was the niece of Louis XIV, born Anne Marie d'Orléans. Louis XV's mother and aunt were born in the palace in 1685 and 1688, respectively.

The Chapel of the Holy Shroud, the current location of the Shroud of Turin, was added to the structure in 1668–1694.

The Dukes of Savoy became the Kings of Sicily in 1713, but they swapped it for the Kingdom of Sardinia and ruled from 1720 after the Treaty of The Hague. Anne Marie d'Orléans died at the palace in 1728.

Victor Amadeus III married Maria Antonietta of Spain and the couple preferred to reside in the country in the Palazzina di caccia di Stupinigi. The Neoclassical style was introduced to the palace in the reign of Charles Emmanuel III. The palace was overshadowed by the Stupinigi building later on, when Victor Emmanuel II of Sardinia married Maria Adelaide of Austria. The palace once again saw some life with the redecoration of some of its rooms.

In 1946, the palace was claimed by the Italian Republic and turned into a "Museum of the Life and Works of the House of Savoy". Its rooms are decorated with rich tapestries and a collection of Chinese and Japanese vases. The Royal Armoury houses an extensive array of arms, including examples from the 16th and 17th centuries.

The palace houses the Scala delle Forbici, a staircase by Filippo Juvarra. The Chapel of the Holy Shroud, with its spiral dome, was built in the west wing of the palace, joining the apse (a semicircular recess) of the Cathedral of St. John the Baptist, to house the famous Shroud of Turin, which belonged to the family from 1453 until 1946. The royal gates of the palace have a golden Medusa symbol embossed on them, in order to fend off intruders.

Anna Caterina Gilli was active as a decorative painter at the palace.

== See also ==
- List of Baroque residences
