= Giovanni Michele Graneri =

Italian painter

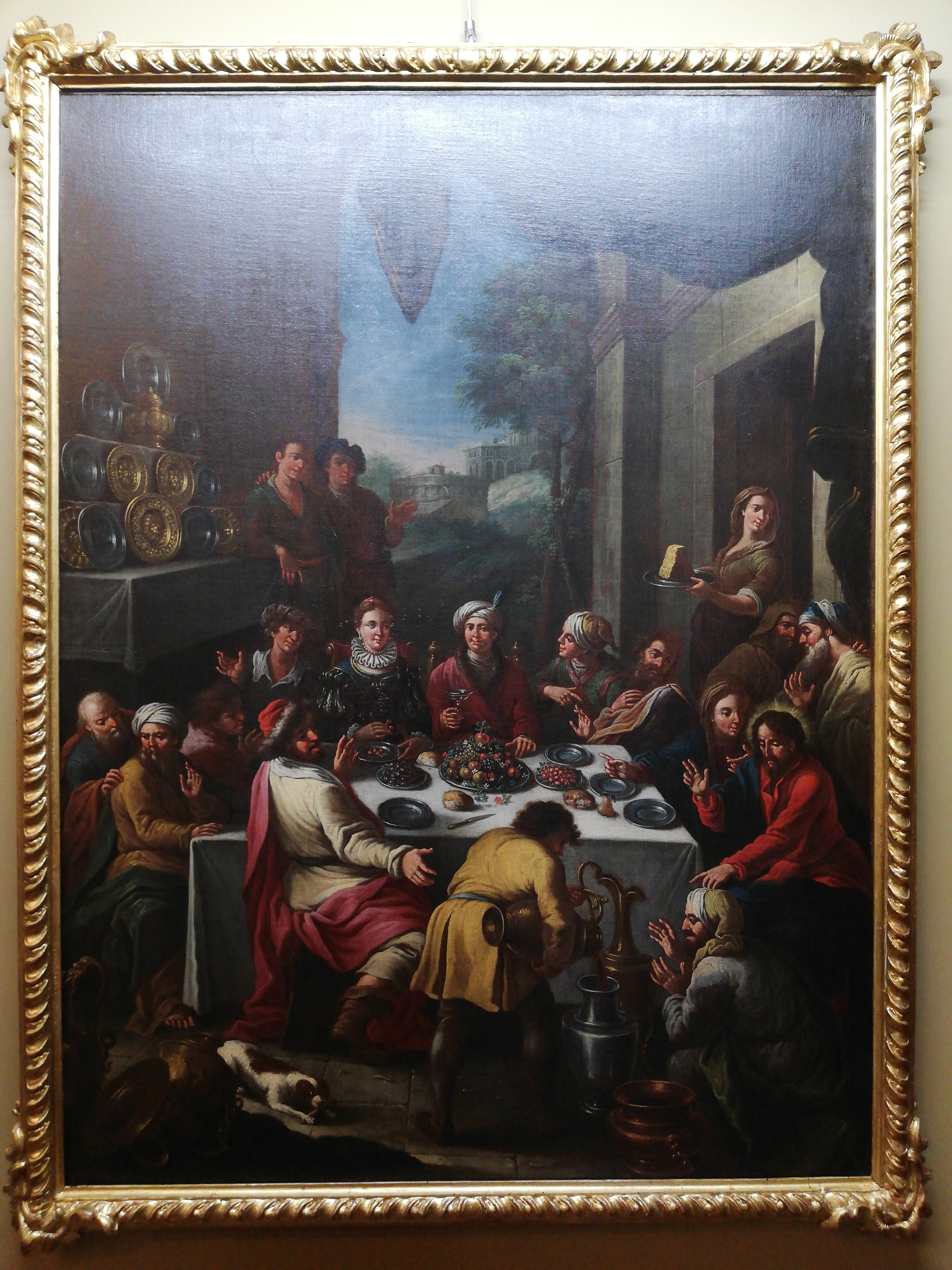
Le Nozze di Cana

Giovanni Michele Graneri (1708 in Turin – 1762 in Turin) was a painter of genre scenes or Bamboccio scenes. He was a pupil of Domenico Olivieri.

Among his works is the Lottery Drawing at Piazza del Erbe. This painting shows a crowded marketplace, as does his Market at Piazza San Carlo.
