= Villafranca d'Asti =

- Comune
- Comune di Villafranca d'Asti
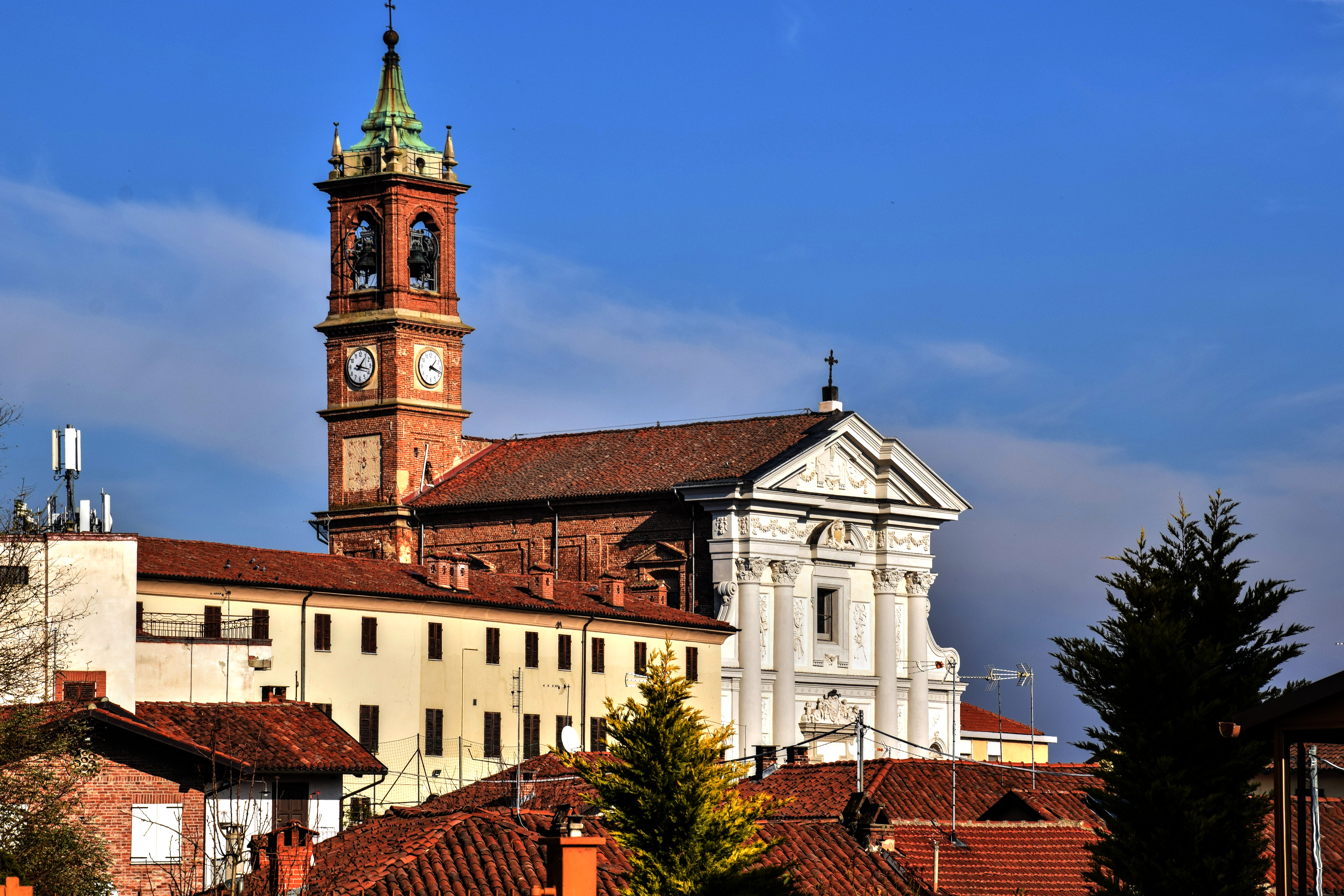

- Coat of arms

- Location within Italy Location within Piedmont
- Coordinates: 44°55′N 8°2′E
- Country: Italy
- Region: Piedmont
- Province: Asti (AT)
- Frazioni: Antoniassi, Borgovecchio, Case Bertona, Case Bruciate, Castella, Crocetta, Mondorosso, Montanello, Taverne, San Grato, Sant'Antonio, Valle Audana

Government
  - Mayor: Guido Cavalla

Area
  - Total: 12.9 km^{2} (5.0 sq mi)
- Elevation: 206 m (676 ft)

Population (31 May 2007)
  - Total: 3,139
  - Density: 243/km^{2} (630/sq mi)
- Demonym: Villafranchesi
- Time zone: UTC+1 (CET)
  - Summer (DST): UTC+2 (CEST)
- Postal code: 14018
- Dialing code: 0141
- Patron saint: Assumption of the Holy Virgin
- Saint day: 15 August
- Website: Official website

Villafranca d'Asti is a comune (municipality) in the Province of Asti in the Italian region Piedmont, located about 30 kilometres (19 mi) southeast of Turin and about 13 kilometres (8 mi) west of Asti.

The town was founded by the commune of Asti in 1275. It is home to the church of Sant'Elena, built in 1646–52 under design of Amedeo di Castellamonte.

The Villafranchian geological age is named for the town.
