= Daniel Seiter =

Italian painter

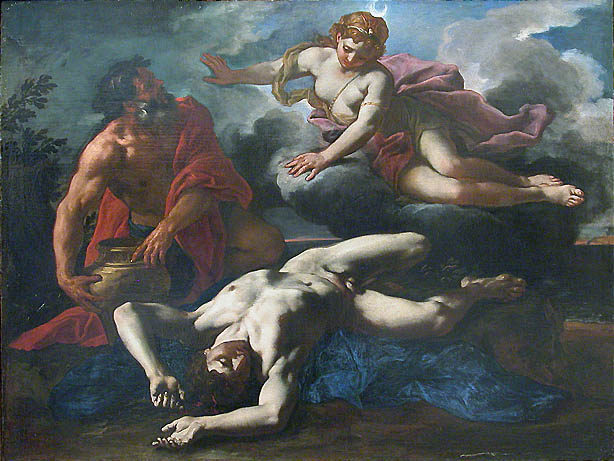
Daniel Seiter, Diana next to the Corpse of Orion, Louvre, 1685

Daniel Seiter, Saiter, or Seyter (c. 1642/1647–1705) was a Viennese-born painter of the Baroque, who trained and worked in Italy.

== Biography ==
According to Houbraken, Seiter was born on the border of Switzerland and brought up in Vienna. It is unknown who his first teacher was, but as a young man he crossed the alps to Venice, where he apprenticed with Johann Carl Loth. He copied his style so well, that even at the time Houbraken was writing (1718), it was impossible to tell whether a painting was by him or Lott. He then moved to Rome to work in the studio of Carlo Maratta, and while there, he joined the Bentvueghels and received the bent nickname of Morgenstar. His Martyrdom of St Catherine (1685) and Martyrdom of St Lawrence remained on its original place, the side walls of the vestibule of the Cybo Chapel in Santa Maria del Popolo.

Becoming successful in Rome, he married a bookseller's daughter and won a lucrative commission from Charles Emmanuel II, Duke of Savoy. The Duke's son Victor Amadeus II of Sardinia commissioned him in turn to decorate the Royal Palace of Turin in 1675, when he became duke after his father died. He liked Seiter's work so much that he knighted him. Today there is still a gallery there named after him. He also helped decorate in fresco the cupola of the chapel of the Ospedale Maggiore.

Seiter followed Victor Amadeus on his travels, and painted in Brunswick and Dresden.

== Trivia ==
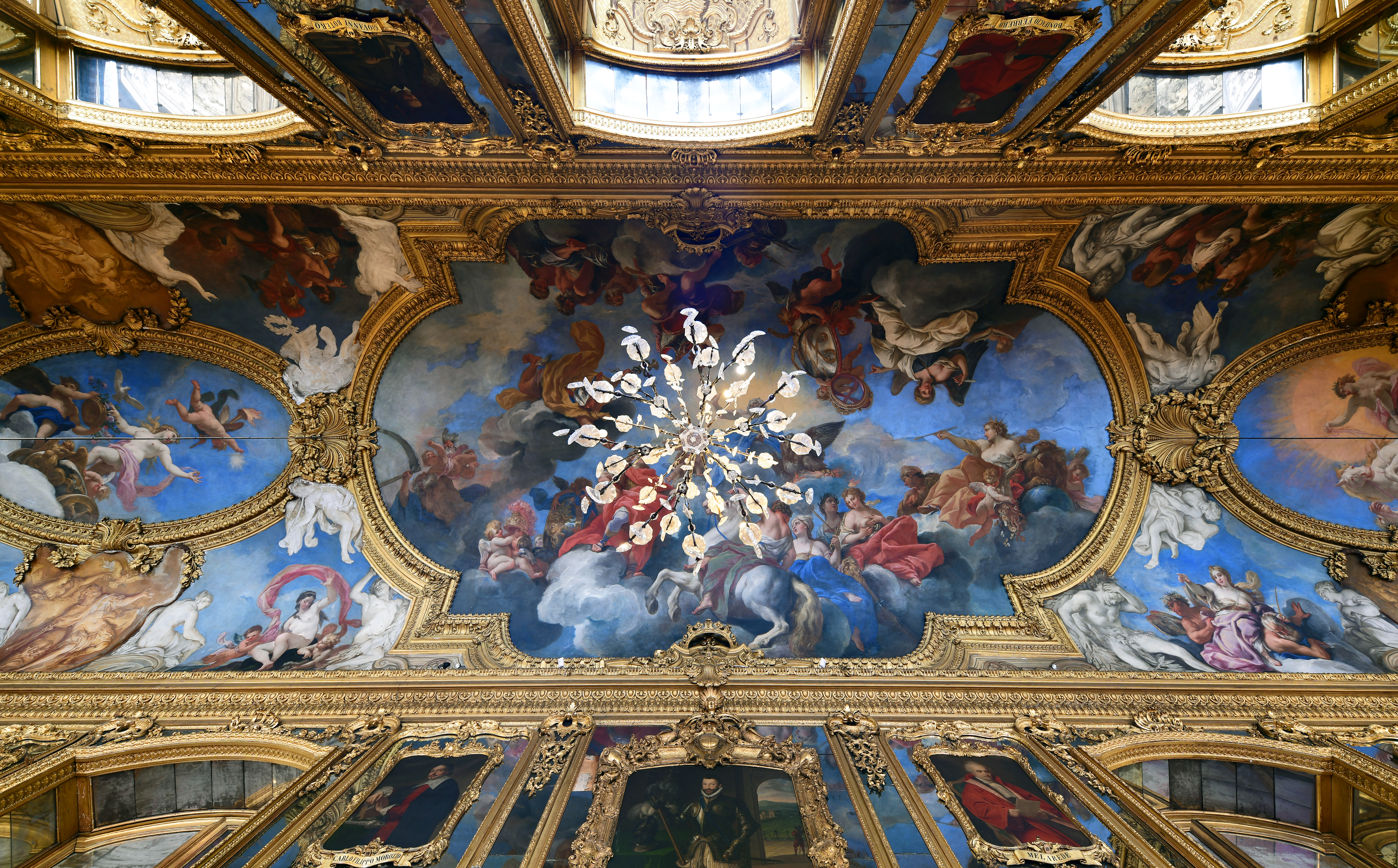
Daniel Seiter Hall in the Royal Palace of Turin.

In his biography of Seiter, Houbraken tells a curious anecdote about the Duke and Seiter, saying that Seiter was given a walking cane with diamonds on the head of it, to use as a maulstick to rest his hand on while painting. This story was told to him by a painter named Le Blon. He calls it a Maalstok. When Seiter was done painting he tried to give it back, but the Duke's guard told him to keep it as a token of regard. A similar expensive gift (it was solid gold) was given to Daniel Seghers by Frederick Henry, Prince of Orange in exchange for a garland painting that hangs today in the Mauritshuis museum.

Though details of his career are sketchy, Seiter became a painter for the Dukes of Savoy much later than 1655, and thus was not a witness to his patron's murderous massacre of the Vaudois, which the poet John Milton memorialized in his On the Late Massacre in Piedmont. Seiter died in Turin.
