= Ascanio Vitozzi =

Italian soldier, architect, and military engineer

Ascanio Vitozzi (also spelled Ascanio Baschi di Vitozzo or Vittozzi) (1539–23 October 1615) was an Italian soldier, architect, and military engineer.

Born at Orvieto, the son of Ercole Lord of Montevitozzo (or Vitozzo), he fought in the Papal army in his early years and was present during the battle of Lepanto in 1571.

Subsequently, he became a military engineer and architect. He was noted by Duke Emmanuel Philibert of Savoy, who called him to Turin, which was then (especially under the latter's successor, Charles Emmanuel I) undergoing a large series of urban renovations. Vittozzi worked on numerous civil and military architectures for the Savoyards, including the Castle of Rivoli, the Sanctuary of Vicoforte (near Mondovì), the church of Corpus Domini, and the Royal Palace of Turin.

He died in Turin on 23 October 1615. His collaborators included Carlo di Castellamonte, who inherited several of Vitozzi's projects.
