= Amedeo di Castellamonte =

Italian painter

Amedeo Cognengo di Castellamonte (1618 – 17 September 1683) was an Italian architect, civil and military engineer.

== Biography ==
He was born in Castellamonte (in what is now the province of Turin, then in the Duchy of Savoy). His father Carlo became chief architect of Duke Charles Emmanuel I of Savoy in 1615.

After graduating in law in the University of Turin and continuing his studies in Rome, Amedeo begun to work alongside his father, whose works later he continued thanks to his significant talent in urban planning and architecture.

In 1646 he continued works at the Ducal (now Royal) Palace in Turin, finishing (1658) the facade and the central body flanked by two raised ones, and the relative connection with the castle square. Later Amedeo was commissioned to create a new plan of for the city's expansions, after the one led by his father in 1620. As in the latter's, he kept the original Roman's centuriation, but also kept the oblique course of the "Borgo Po" (modern Via Po) leading to the then only existing bridge on the Po River to Chieri. In the same streets, he added porticoes and terraces forming an uninterrupted, 1,250 m-long path from the Royal Palace to the Po. The new street was opened in 1674. He also designed the Piazza Carlo Emanuele II, connected to Via Po by a new street, what is now Via Accademia Albertina. However, as works dragged on most of Castellamonte's designs were not followed exactly, like in the Piazza Carlo Emanuele II which did not receive an octagonal plan as in his design.

Castellamonte was also entrusted the works of the Reggia di Venaria (Charles Emmanuel's II new large hunting residence, begun in 1658) and the Cavallerizza Reale (Royal Stables), built from the late 17th century and continued, among the others, by Filippo Juvarra and Benedetto Alfieri. He also continued and completed his father's works at the Castello del Valentino and intervened in the churches of San Salvario and San Francesco di Paola, the Castle of Rivoli and (according to some sources) the Villa della Regina.

In 1646 he designed the church of Sant'Elena at Villafranca d'Asti followed in 1654 by the church of Santi Bernardino e Brigida at Lucenta and, finally, the Chapel of the Shroud in Turin, which later was totally modified by Guarino Guarini. He also built numerous fortifications and stage-settings for court celebrations, and worked in private noble palaces such as Palazzo Lascaris. He did various works for Princess Luisa Cristina of Savoy, sister of Charles Emmanuel II.
