= Carlo di Castellamonte =

Italian architect, civil and military engineer

Carlo Cognengo di Castellamonte (1560–1641) was an Italian architect, civil and military engineer, one of the main exponents of Piedmontese Baroque.

Castellamonte was born in Turin. After his studies in Rome, he returned in Piedmont where was assistant to Ascanio Vitozzi. Named Architect of the House of Savoy in 1615, he continued the program of urban and architectural renovation of Turin commissioned to Vitozzi by Charles Emmanuel I.

Castellamonte worked at the prosecution of Via Roma (1621), the project of the Piazza Reale (today San Carlo Square), the church of St. Christine on the latter (façade by Filippo Juvarra from 1715 to 1718), the enlargement of the Castle of Valentino (begun in 1633 and continued by his son Amedeo), the restoration of Palazzo Madama (also in collaboration with Amedeo) and the Castle of Moncalieri.

He died in Turin.
