= Isabella of Savoy =

- Hereditary Princess of Modena
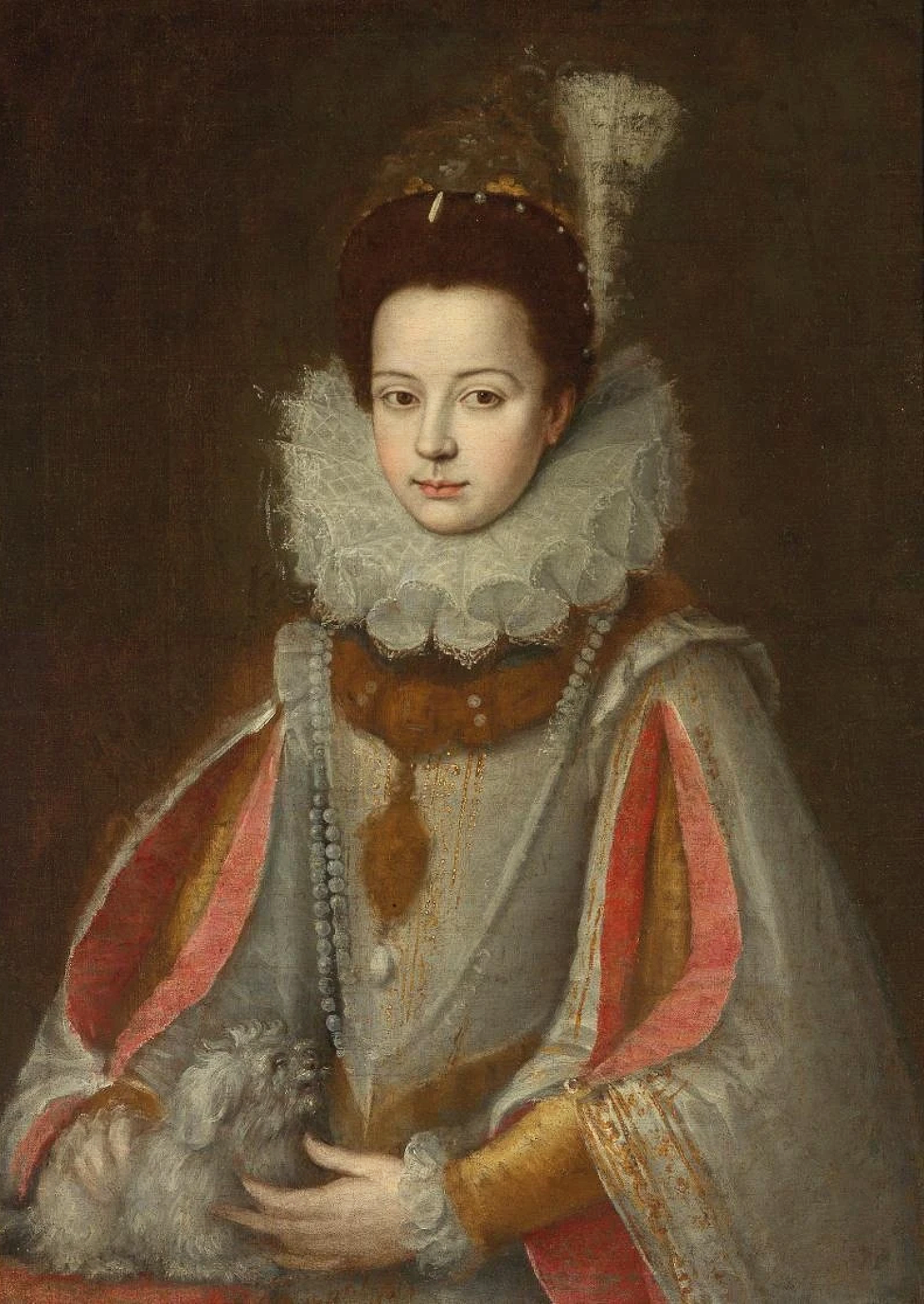
- Portrait of Isabella of Savoy, attributed to Sofonisba Anguissola
- Born: 2 March 1591; Turin, Italy
- Died: 28 August 1626 (aged 35)
- Spouse: Alfonso d'Este, Hereditary Prince of Modena (m. 1608)
- Issue: Margherita, Duchess of Guastalla; Anna Beatrice, Duchess of Mirandola; Francesco I, Duke of Modena; Obizzo, Cardinal d'Este; Rinaldo, Cardinal d'Este
- House: Savoy
- Father: Charles Emmanuel I, Duke of Savoy
- Mother: Catherine Michelle of Spain

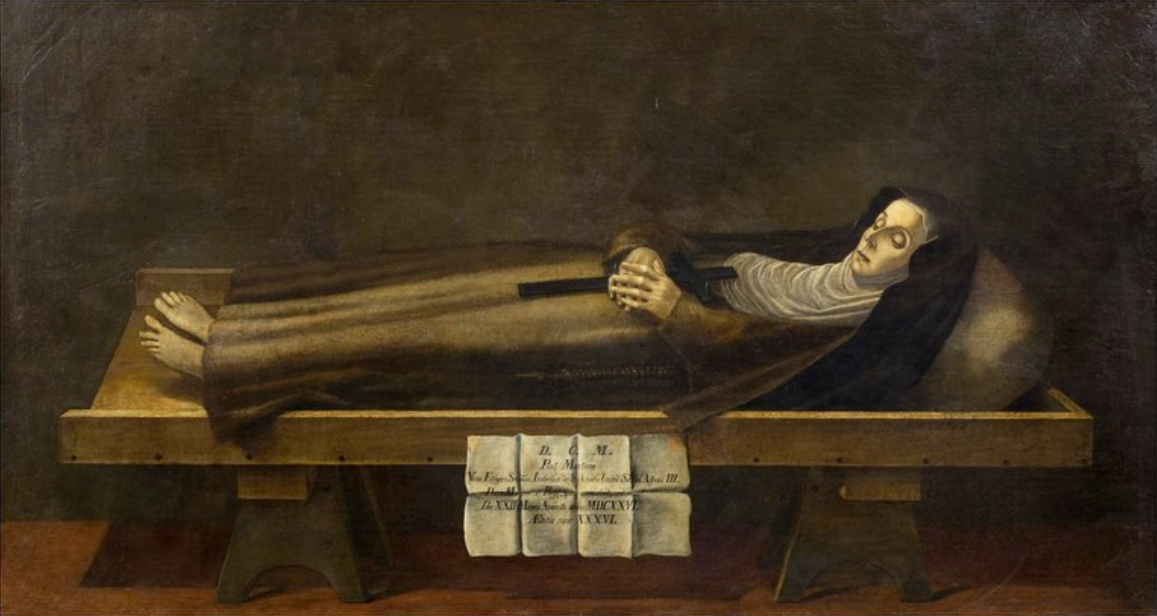
Deathbed of Hereditary Duchess Isabella of Modena

Isabella of Savoy (2 March 1591 – 28 August 1626) was the daughter of Charles Emmanuel I, Duke of Savoy, and Catherine Michelle of Spain. Her maternal grandparents were Philip II of Spain and Elisabeth of Valois, and her paternal grandparents were Emmanuel Philibert, Duke of Savoy, and Margaret of France, Duchess of Berry. She was a Hereditary Princess of Modena who died before her husband became Duke of Modena in 1628.

== Life ==
Isabella was born in Turin to Charles Emmanuel I, Duke of Savoy and Infanta Catherine Michelle of Spain, a daughter of Philip II of Spain and Elisabeth of France.

=== Marriage ===
On 22 February 1608, Isabella married Alfonso, Hereditary Prince of Modena (a son of Cesare d'Este and Virginia de' Medici) in Turin. This was a happy marriage; Alfonso was loving and loyal towards his wife. Within a year and a half, Isabella bore Alfonso a son, Cesare. The couple were more devoted to each other than to their children; the death of their first child and son in 1613 was not even painful for his parents, who did not attend his funeral. Their second son Francesco would one day succeed his father as Duke of Modena and Reggio.

When Isabella died in childbirth on 28 August 1626, Alfonso was heartbroken; he never remarried and died in 1644. Like her mother, Isabella had been constantly pregnant during much of her marriage, giving birth almost once (and sometimes twice) per year. She died before her husband became duke, so she was never a Duchess of Modena.

=== Issue ===
Isabella and Alfonso had 14 children in just 17 years, but only nine of them lived to adulthood:

- Cesare d'Este (14 August 1609 – 14 October 1613), died in childhood;
- Francesco d'Este (6 September 1610 – 14 October 1658), Duke of Modena; he married Maria Farnese, Vittoria Farnese d'Este and Lucrezia Barberini
- Obizzo d'Este (24 September 1611 – 24 August 1644), Bishop of Modena;
- Caterina d'Este (2 February 1613 – 1635), a nun;
- Cesare d'Este (1614 – 20 September 1677)
- Alessandro d'Este (1615), died in infancy;
- Carlo Alessandro d'Este (1616–1679), intellectually disabled
- Rinaldo d'Este (10 August 1617 – 30 September 1672), Cardinal
- Margherita d'Este (12 September 1618 – 12 November 1692), who married Ferrante III Gonzaga, Duke of Guastalla
- Beatrice d'Este (7 November 1619 – 23 January 1622), died in childhood;
- Beatrice d'Este (14-15 February 1622), died in infancy;
- Filiberto d'Este (14 January 1624 – September 1645), a novice in the Capuchin order who died of smallpox;
- Bonifazio d'Este (18 December 1624), died shortly after birth;
- Anna Beatrice d'Este (21 July 1626 – 25 September 1690), who married Alessandro II Pico della Mirandola

== Ancestry ==
Ancestors of Isabella of Savoy

16. Philip II, Duke of Savoy
8. Charles III, Duke of Savoy
17. Claudine of Brosse
4. Emmanuel Philibert, Duke of Savoy
18. Manuel I of Portugal
9. Infanta Beatriz, Duchess of Savoy
19. Maria of Aragon
2. Charles Emmanuel I, Duke of Savoy
20. Charles, Count of Angoulême
10. Francis I of France
21. Louise of Savoy
5. Margaret of France, Duchess of Berry
22. Louis XII of France
11. Claude of France
23. Anne of Brittany
1. Isabella of Savoy
24. Philip I of Castile
12. Charles V, Holy Roman Emperor
25. Joanna of Castile
6. Philip II of Spain
26. Manuel I of Portugal (= 18)
13. Isabella of Portugal
27. Maria of Aragon (= 19)
3. Infanta Catherine Michelle of Spain
28. Francis I of France (= 10)
14. Henry II of France
29. Claude of France (= 11)
7. Elisabeth of Valois
30. Lorenzo II de' Medici, Duke of Urbino
15. Catherine de' Medici
31. Madeleine de La Tour d'Auvergne

== Sources ==
- Condren, John (2024). Louis XIV and the Peace of Europe: French Diplomacy in Northern Italy, 1659–1701. Taylor & Francis.
- Hester, Nathalie (2017). "Baroque Italian Epic from Granada to the New World: Columbus Conquers the Moors". In Horodowich, Elizabeth; Markey, Lia (eds.). The New World in early modern Italy, 1492-1750. Cambridge, United Kingdom: Cambridge University Press. pp. 270–287. ISBN 978-1-107-12287-1. OCLC 987794999.
- Osbourne, Toby (2002). Dynasty and Diplomacy in the Court of Savoy: Political Culture and the Thirty Years' War. Cambridge University Press.
- Symcox, Geoffrey (1997). "From commune to capital: the transformation of Turin, sixteenth to eighteenth centuries". In Oresko, Robert; Gibbs, G. C.; Scott, H. M. (eds.). Royal and Republican Sovereignty in Early Modern Europe: Essays in Memory of Ragnhild Hatton. Cambridge University Press. pp. 242–271. ISBN 9780521419109.
