= Infanta Isabella Clara Eugenia and Infanta Catherine Michaela =

Painting attributed to Alonso Sánchez Coello and studio

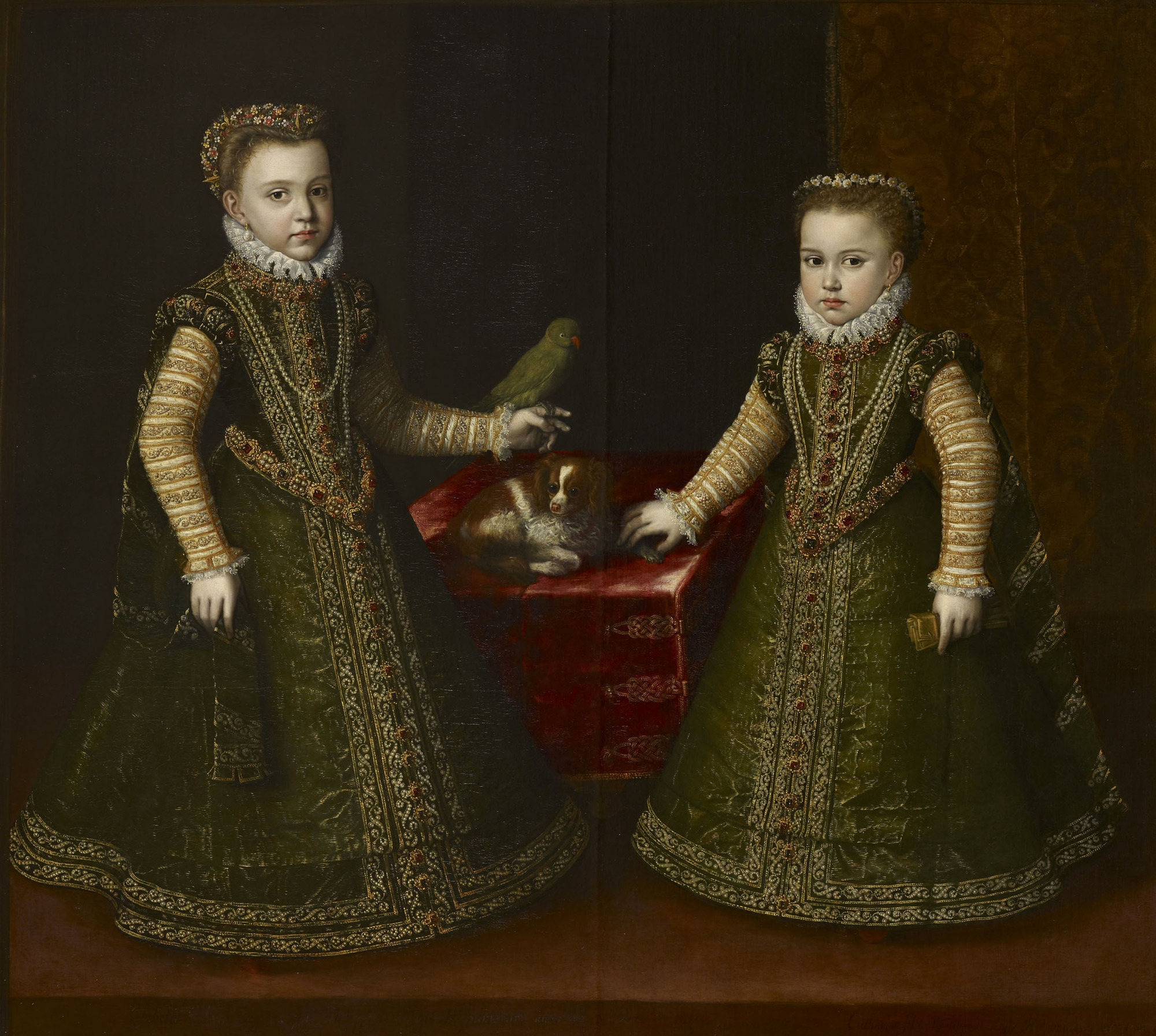
Infanta Isabella Clara Eugenia and Infanta Catherine Michelle (1569–1570) attributed to Alonso Sánchez Coello and studio

Infanta Isabella Clara Eugenia and Infanta Catherine Michaela is an oil-on-canvas painting created during 1569–1570 attributed to the Spanish artist Alonso Sánchez Coello and his studio, now in the Royal Collection at Buckingham Palace. It shows Isabella Clara Eugenia and Catherine Michaela, two daughters of Philip II of Spain and his third wife Elizabeth of Valois.
