= Emmanuel Philibert of Savoy (1588–1624) =

Viceroy of Sicily from 1622 to 1624

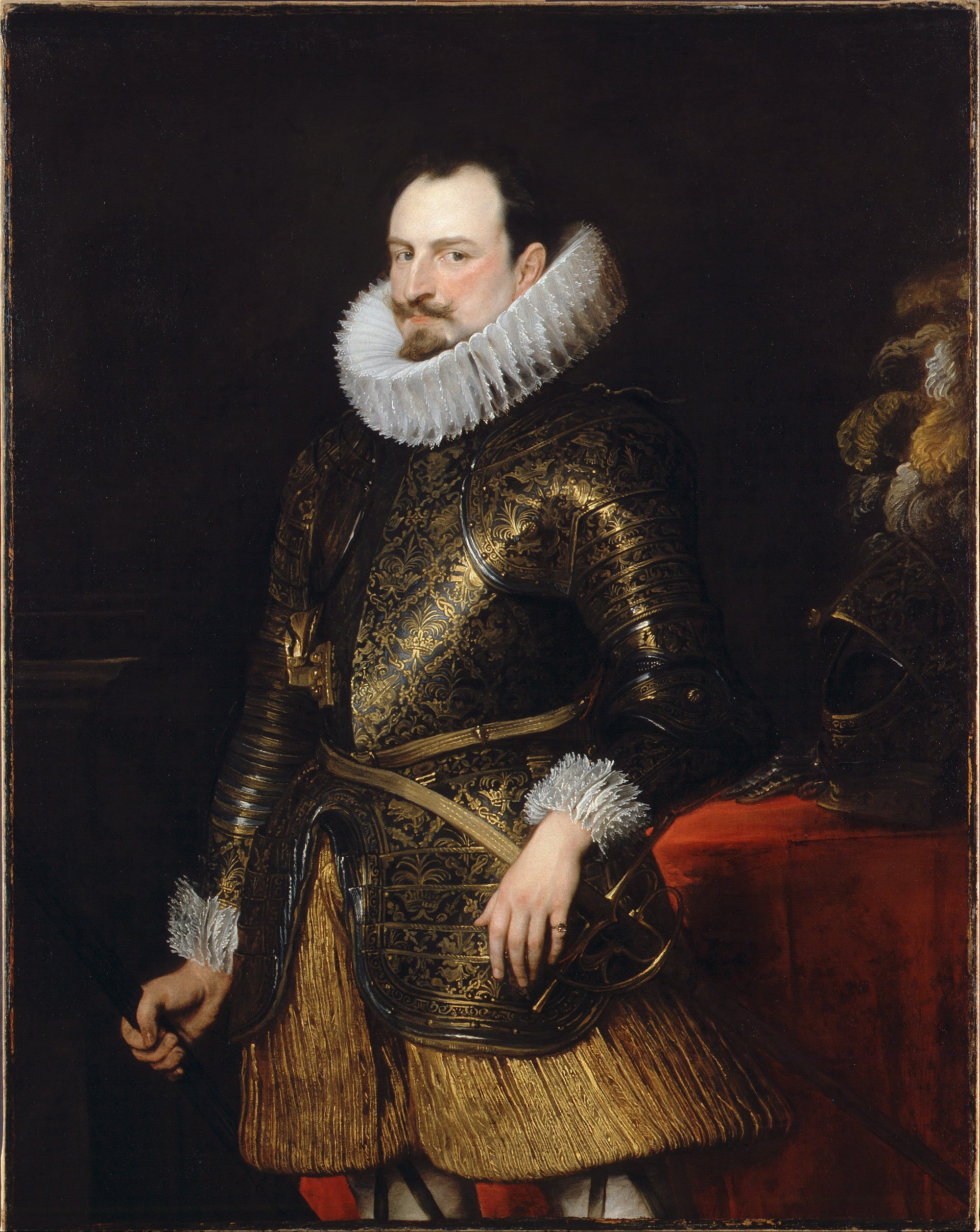
Emmanuel Philibert, painted by Anthony van Dyck

Emmanuel Philibert of Savoy (16 April 1588 – 4 August 1624) was the third son of Charles Emmanuel I, Duke of Savoy, and was Viceroy of Sicily between 1622 and 1624.

== Biography ==
Born in Turin, Emmanuel Philibert of Savoy was the third son of Charles Emmanuel I, Duke of Savoy and Infanta Catherine Michelle of Spain.

He was destined for a career in the Church and entered at the age of 12 in the Order of the Knights Hospitaller, but later he pursued a military career. In 1603 he and his elder brothers, Philip Emmanuel and Victor Amadeus, traveled to Madrid, to complete their education. After the death of Philip Emmanuel, they returned to Savoy in 1606, where the second brother Victor Amadeus became hereditary prince.

In 1610, Emmanuel Philibert returned to Madrid, and entered in the service of King Philip III of Spain, who made him Grand Admiral of Spain. Under the next King Philip IV of Spain, Emmanuel Philibert was appointed in 1622 viceroy of Sicily. His reign came to an end when he died at the age of 36 in the Plague epidemic of 1624. He was buried in the crypt of the lower church of the palatine chapel of the Norman Palace in Palermo.

Anthony van Dyck made a painting of him in 1623, after being invited by the Viceroy to Palermo. The painting is now conserved in the Dulwich Picture Gallery, London.

Government offices
Preceded by Francisco Ruiz de Castro	Viceroy of Sicily; 1622-1624	Succeeded by Giovanni; Cardinal Doria
