= Hereditary princesses of Modena =

This is a list of princesses of Modena. They often became Duchesses by marriage to the Duke of the Este Family.

== Hereditary princess of Modena ==
Picture	Name	Father	Birth	Marriage	Became Princess	Ceased to be Princess	Death	Spouse
	Lucrezia Borgia	Rodrigo Borgia, Pope Alexander VI (Borgia)	18 April 1480	2 February 1502		15 June 1505 became Duchess	24 June 1519	Alfonso I
	Renée of France	Louis XII of France (Valois)	25 October 1510	28 June 1528		14 October 1658 became Duchess	12 June 1575	Prince Ercole
	Lucrezia de' Medici	Cosimo I de' Medici, Grand Duke of Tuscany (Medici)	7 June 1545	3 July 1558		3 October 1559 became Duchess	21 April 1562	Prince Alfonso
	Virginia de' Medici	Cosimo I de' Medici, Grand Duke of Tuscany (Medici)	29 May 1568	6 February 1586		27 October 1597 became Duchess	15 January 1615	Prince Cesare
	Isabella of Savoy	Charles Emmanuel I, Duke of Savoy (Savoy)	11 March 1591	22 February 1608		28 August 1626		Prince Alfonso
	Laura Martinozzi	Girolamo Martinozzi (Martinozzi)	27 May 1639	27 May 1655		14 October 1658 became Duchess	19 July 1687	Prince Alfonso
	Charlotte Aglaé d'Orléans	Philippe, Duke of Orléans (Orléans)	20 October 1700	21 June 1720		26 October 1737 became Duchess	19 January 1761	Prince Francesco
	Maria Teresa Cybo-Malaspina, Duchess of Massa	Alderano I Cybo-Malaspina, Duke of Massa (Cybo Malaspina)	29 June 1725	16 April 1741		22 February 1780 became Duchess	29 December 1790	Prince Ercole

== See also ==
- List of Modenese consorts
