= Hereditary princes of Modena =

This is a list of hereditary princes of Modena, in Italy. The list spans 1597 to 1780.

== Hereditary Prince of Modena ==
Picture	Name	Father	Birth	Became Prince	Ceased to be Prince	Death	Spouse	Marriage
	Prince Alfonso	Cesare	22 October 1591	27 October 1597	11 December 1628 father's death	26 May 1644	Isabella of Savoy	22 February 1608
	Prince Francesco	Cesare	6 September 1610	11 December 1628	1629 fathers abdication	14 October 1658	Maria Farnese Vittoria Farnese Lucrezia Barberini	11 January 1631 12 February 1648 14 October 1654
	Prince Alfonso	Prince Francesco	1632		1632	1632	never married	
	Prince Alfonso	Prince Francesco	14 October 1634		14 October 1658 father's death	16 July 1662	Laura Martinozzi	27 May 1655
	Prince Francesco	Prince Alfonso	6 March 1660		16 July 1662 father's death	6 September 1694	Margherita Maria Farnese	14 July 1692
	Prince Francesco	Duke Rinaldo	2 July 1698		26 October 1737 father's death	22 February 1780	Charlotte Aglaé d'Orléans	21 June 1720
	Prince Ercole Rinaldo	Prince Francesco	22 November 1727	26 October 1737	22 February 1780 father's death	14 October 1803	Maria Teresa Cybo-Malaspina, Duchess of Massa	16 April 1741

== See also ==
- Dukes of Modena
