= Giacomo Vighi =

16th-century Italian painter

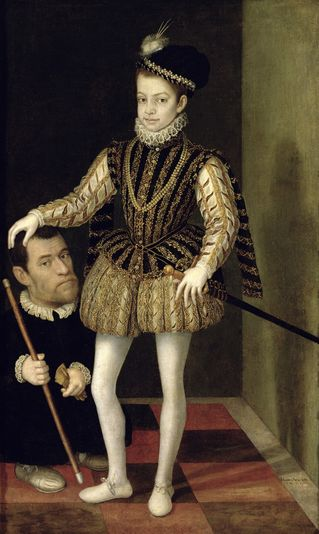
Portrait of the future Charles Emmanuel I and his Court dwarf.

Giacomo Vighi (circa 1510–1570) was an Italian painter; he was active mainly in the court of the House of Savoy as a portrait painter.

== Biography ==
Vighi was born likely in Argenta, near Ferrara. He is said to have painted a loggetta in the tower of Santa Caterina in the Castello di Ferrara, depicting the then princes and princesses of the House of Este. In Turin, he became the official portrait painter of the Royal family. He traveled to France, Spain, Bohemia, and Saxony in this role. He was also commissioned by Emmanuel Philibert, Duke of Savoy, as a buyer for artworks for the Savoy Palaces. Two of his portraits, Emmanuel Philibert and Carlo Emanuele I, remain in the Galleria Sabauda.
