= Charles Emmanuel I =

Duke of Savoy from 1580 to 1630

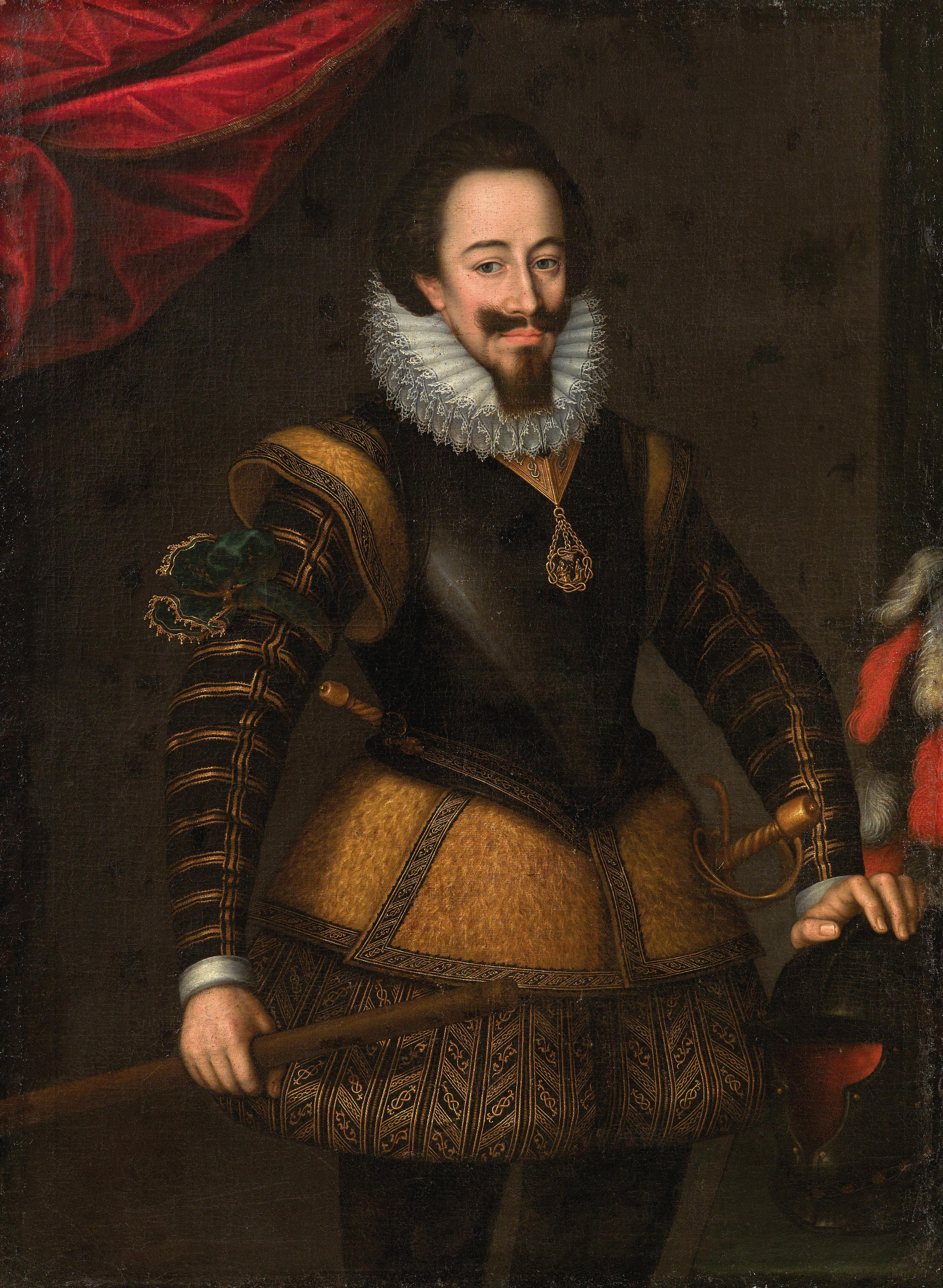
- Portrait by unknown, c. 17th century

Duke of Savoy
- Reign: 30 August 1580 – 26 July 1630
- Predecessor: Emmanuel Philibert
- Successor: Victor Amadeus I
- Born: 12 January 1562; Castle of Rivoli, Rivoli, Duchy of Savoy
- Died: 26 July 1630 (aged 68); Savigliano, Duchy of Savoy
- Spouse: Catalina Micaela of Spain (m. 1585; died 1597)
- Issue more...: Philip Emmanuel, Prince of Piedmont; Victor Amadeus I, Duke of Savoy; Emanuel Filibert, Viceroy of Sicily; Margaret, Duchess of Mantua; Isabella, Hereditary Princess of Modena; Maurice of Savoy; Thomas Francis, Prince of Carignano
- House: Savoy
- Father: Emmanuel Philibert, Duke of Savoy
- Mother: Margaret of Valois, Duchess of Berry
- Religion: Catholic Church
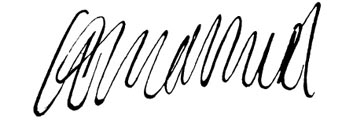
- Signature

Charles Emmanuel I (Italian: Carlo Emanuele di Savoia; 12 January 1562 – 26 July 1630), known as the Great and nicknamed Testa di Fuoco (Piedmontese: Testa d'feu; "Hothead", a sobriquet attributed to his aggressive and rash military character), was the Duke of Savoy and ruler of the Savoyard states from 30 August 1580 until his death on 26 July 1630, nearly 50 years later. At the time of his death, he was the longest-reigning Savoyard monarch, a record later surpassed by his great-grandson Victor Amadeus II.

A bold and ambitious ruler, Charles Emmanuel sought to expand Savoyard influence throughout northern Italy during a period marked by the French wars of religion, the Thirty Years' War, and intense rivalry between France and Spain. He led multiple military campaigns – annexing Saluzzo, Trino and Alba but losing Pinerolo and some transalpine territories – and often played European powers against each other in complex diplomatic maneuvers. He was also a patron of the arts and a writer himself.

His campaigns against Spanish influence contributed to the emergence of early Italian nationalist sentiment in 17th-century poetry and political discourse.

== Biography ==
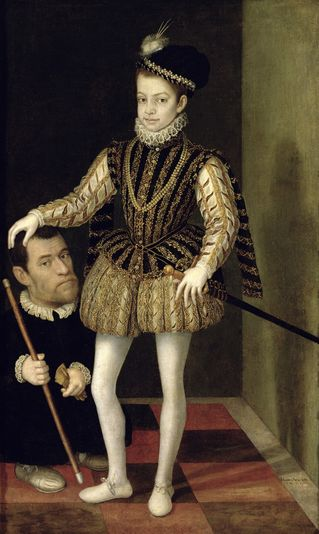
Charles Emmanuel as a boy with dwarf, portrait by Giacomo Vighi, c. 1572

Charles was born in the Castle of Rivoli in Piedmont, the only child of Emmanuel Philibert, Duke of Savoy and Margaret of France, Duchess of Berry. He succeeded his father as duke on 30 August 1580.

His father was a devout Catholic and advised Charles to follow in his footsteps:

My son, I urge you above all to be a true friend and devout servant of God and His holy Catholic religion, as were your ancestors. Never begin anything without first asking His favor and help, for while we men know little, that Majesty sees all and is eternal wisdom. So long as you rely on Him, you will be safe.

Well-educated and intelligent, Charles spoke Italian, French, Spanish, as well as Latin. He proved an able warrior although short and hunchbacked.

=== Conflict against France, Geneva and Swiss cantons ===
In the autumn of 1588, taking advantage of the civil war weakening France, he occupied the Marquisate of Saluzzo, which was a French possession since 1548.

The new king, Henry IV, demanded the restitution of that land, but Charles Emmanuel refused, and war ensued. Geneva and Swiss cantons joined the French coalition. However, the offensive against Savoy was repelled (April 1589) and Bern signed a truce (October 1589). In 1590, Charles Emmanuel sent an expedition to Provence in the interests of the Catholic League, and followed it himself later, but the peace of 1593, by which Henry of Navarre was recognized as king of France, put an end to his ambitions.

On 1 August 1591, the Duke of Savoy appointed Tomás Fernández de Medrano as his Secretary of State and War, Medrano's expertise in diplomacy and military strategy would have greatly benefited the duchy's political and military endeavours. The broader conflict involving France and Spain ended with the Peace of Vervins (2 May 1598), which left the current but separate question of Saluzzo unsolved. After the Duke started talks with Spain, Henry threatened to return to war until, with the Treaty of Lyon (17 January 1601), Saluzzo went to Savoy in exchange for Bresse, Bugey, and Gex.

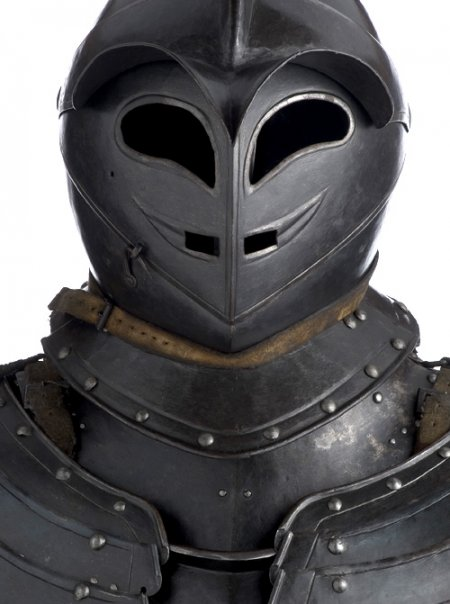
Savoyard armour captured by the Genevans after Charles Emmanuel's failed attack on Geneva

Having made peace with France, Charles Emmanuel attacked the city of Geneva. On 11 December that year, he led his troops to the city during the night and they surrounded the city walls by two in the morning. The Savoyard cuirassiers were ordered to dismount and climb the city walls in full armour as a shock tactic. However, the alarm was raised by a night watchman and Geneva's militia rose to meet the invaders. The attempted raid failed with 54 Savoyards killed and many more captured. Charles Emmanuel's army retreated in a panic and the Savoyard prisoners were executed. The heavy helmets worn by Charles Emmanuel's troops, with visors made in a stylized imitation of a human face, were known as "Savoyard" helmets after this notorious incident. A number of these suits of armour were captured by the Swiss and kept as trophies. The Geneva militia's successful defence of the city's walls is still celebrated as an act of heroism during the annual festival of L'Escalade. The treaty of St. Julien in July 1603 ended the conflict between Savoy and Geneva, with each side restoring occupied territories to the other.

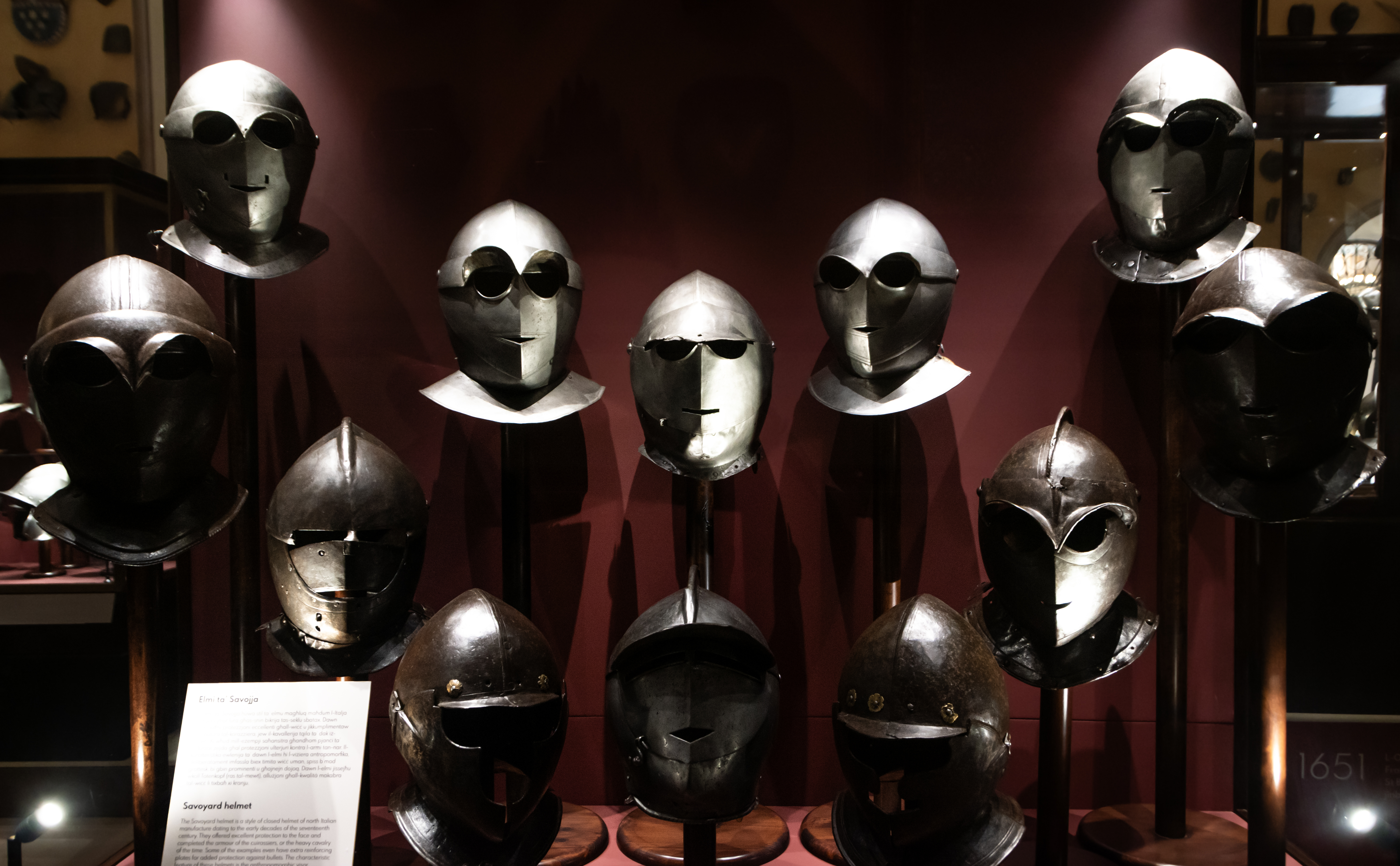
Savoyard helmets displayed at the Palace Armoury in Valletta, Malta

=== Oration of the Duke ===
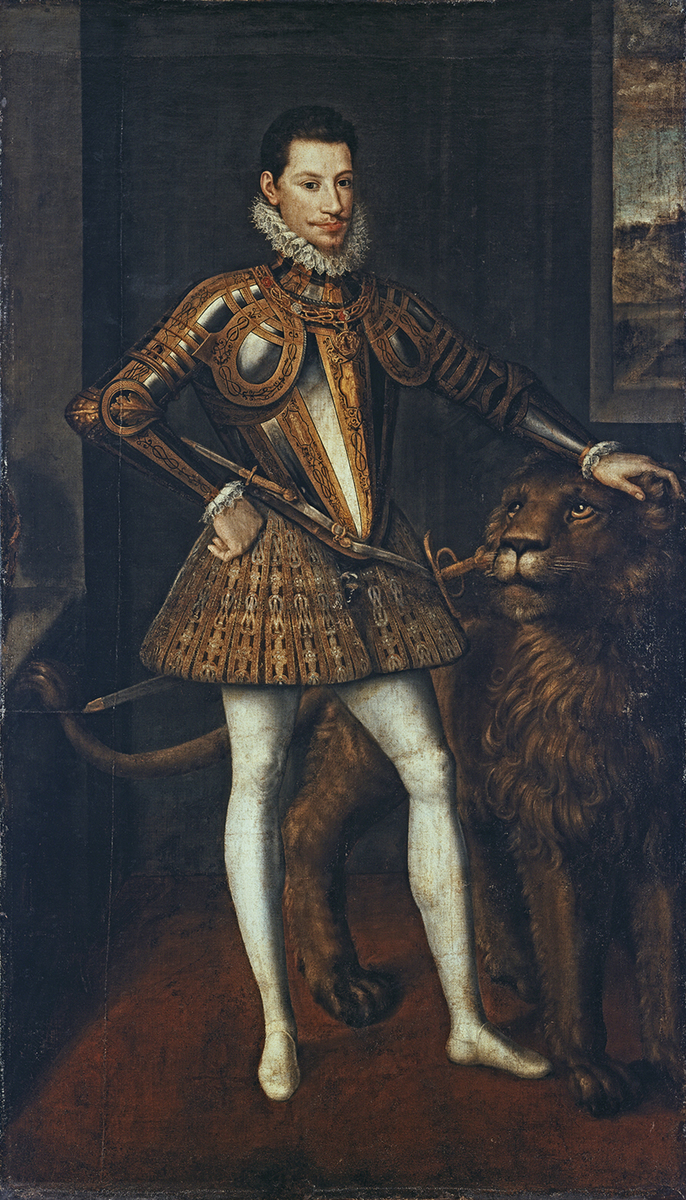
Portrait by Jan Kraeck

The Duke's Secretary of State and War, Tomás Fernández de Medrano, wrote an important political treatise titled Republica Mista, published in Madrid in 1602, which contains a rare and accurate record of the Duke of Savoy's oration during the French War of Religion. An excerpt reads:

If the lord has the authority to command his vassals, and the vassals are obliged to obey the lord in matters not against God, how much more so in matters that serve Him, glorify Him, and are for your own well-being? For over six hundred years, your ancestors have lived under mine, in Christian faith and obedience to the Catholic, Apostolic, and Roman Church, building temples and observing sacraments for our salvation. How can you abandon your noble and ancient lineage, the honor of your Catholic heritage, and the religion embraced by your ancestors? By aligning with heretics—those who, abandoning God’s Church, have chosen false associations—you now become adversaries of Christ and allies of Satan. There is but one true faith, one Church, and one shepherd: the Roman Pontiff. Do you not see that false religions have sown discord, creating factions and undermining both spiritual and temporal authority? A prince must protect the Catholic faith, for without a strong religion, no empire can remain powerful. Religion and arms united ensure the survival of a monarchy for ages. Let us remember: 'What is best must be honored by the best, and what rules must be served by the ruler.' Turn back to the true faith of your forebears and embrace the unity of Christ's Church, lest you lose the peace and salvation promised to those who remain faithful.

=== Candidate for the Serbian crown ===
Charles Emmanuel was one of the most wanted candidates for the crown of a restored Serbian kingdom, hypothetically presumed after a Christian crusade against the Ottoman Empire during planning for the Great Conspiracy of the late 16th and early 17th centuries under the auspices of Serbian Patriarch Jovan, diplomat Damjan, Herzegovinian Duke Grdan and other chiefs of the Serb clans. At the 1608 Council of Morača, during a gathering of representatives of the Serb clans and the Serbian Church, Charles was elected King of Serbia and invited to convert to Eastern Orthodoxy (as a precondition for being crowned by Patriarch John) and to vow to protect Orthodox Christianity. The conspirators, bearing closely in mind the failures of the 1590 decade, did not want to expose themselves in any action before direct support from the West was forthcoming. Thus no broad uprising of the Balkan Christian peoples against the rule of the Ottoman Turks was sparked, as Charles Emmanuel lacked the financial resources to take the crown and restore the Serbian statehood extinguished in the 15th century.

In 1609, Charles Emmanuel came in contact with Albanian mercenaries like Giovanni Renesi, his brother Demetrio Renesi and a relative Don Joanne Renesi, who intended to revolt against the Ottomans at the Convention of Kuçi in 1614.

=== Alliance with France ===
With the Treaty of Bruzolo (25 April 1610), Charles Emmanuel allied with France against Spain, but the assassination of Henry IV changed the situation, as the treaty was not recognized by Marie de' Medici, who immediately assumed the regency for Henry's son Louis XIII, a minor. Continuing his intrigues, on the death in 1612 of Duke Francesco IV Gonzaga of Mantua, who was lord of the Duchy of Montferrat, Charles Emmanuel caused the war of the Montferrat Succession by assaulting that district. This arrayed the Venetians, Tuscany, the Empire and Spain against him, and he was obliged to relinquish his conquest. However, as Charles Emmanuel refused the Spanish request to unilaterally disarm, war continued between Savoy and Spain. Charles Emmanuel defended Asti and then obtained the help of French troops again in January 1617, as the new king of France resumed his father's alliance with Savoy. The conflict overlapped with the Uskok War, during which Chales Emmanuel sided with the Republic of Venice against Austria and Spain. The two wars were solved by a compromise signed in Paris and Madrid (September 1617): both Spain and Savoy disarmed and restored each other the occupied territories, while an Imperial tribunal would solve the issue on the Montferrat succession; the Uskoks were expelled from their strongholds.

The sister of Louis XIII, Christine Marie, was married to Charles Emmanuel's son, Victor Amadeus in 1619.

Charles Emmanuel took part in the Valtellina War (1620–1626) on the side of the Grisons and France against Spain. He tried with French help to obtain access to the Mediterranean Sea at the expense of Genoa. After Spanish intervention, Genoa was relieved. Charles then successfully defended Verrua Savoia in a long siege by Spanish troops. The Valtellina conflict ended with another compromise: the Treaty of Monçon. The possession of Valtellina was confirmed to the Grisons, with the region keeping its religious autonomy.

=== Shifting alliances and death ===
When the French occupied Casale Monferrato during the War of the Mantuan Succession in 1628, Charles Emmanuel allied again with Spain. During the war, he annexed Trino and Alba to the Savoyard state and defeated a French army in the battle of Sampeyre (August 1628). However, when Richelieu ordered to invade Piedmont again and conquered Susa, the duke changed sides again and returned to an alliance with France. Then, after Philip IV of Spain sent two invasion forces from Genoa and Como under Ambrogio Spinola, Charles Emmanuel declared himself neutral.

During the war, also in 1628 Giovanni Antonio Ansaldo, an agent of Charles Emmanuel, recruited and furnished with ample funds a group of Genoese conspirators led by Giulio Cesare Vachero who were to overthrow the Republic of Genoa and place the city under the protection of the Duchy of Savoy. The plot failed and Vachero and his accomplices were sentenced to death.

in 1630, Richelieu ordered a French army to march into Savoy to force the duke to abandon his neutrality. The French troops, soon backed by another army, occupied Pinerolo and Avigliana and defeated the Savoy army under his son Victor Amadeus in Lower Valsusa. The duke died suddenly of a stroke, while campaigning at Savigliano in late July. He was succeeded by his son Victor Amadeus, who would make peace confirming the annexation of Trino and Alba and the loss of Pinerolo.

== Marriage and issue ==
In 1585, Charles married Catherine Michaela of Spain, daughter of Philip II of Spain and Elizabeth of Valois. They had:

- Filippo Emanuele, Prince of Piedmont (1586–1604)
- Victor Amadeus I, Duke of Savoy (1587–1637), married Christine Marie of France, and had issue;
- Emanuel Filibert (1588–1624), Spanish Viceroy of Sicily (1622–24)
- Margherita (1589–1655), married Francesco IV Gonzaga of Mantua
- Isabella (1591–1626), married Alfonso III d'Este, Hereditary Prince of Modena
- Maurice, a cardinal (1593–1657)
- Maria Apollonia, a nun in Rome (9 February 1594 – 13 July 1656)
- Francesca Caterina, a nun in Biella (6 October 1595 – 26 September 1640)
- Thomas Francis, Prince of Carignano (1596–1656) married Marie de Bourbon, Countess of Soissons
- Giovanna (born 6 October 1597) died at birth.

In Riva di Chieri on 28 November 1629, he secretly married his long-time and official mistress, Marguerite de Rossillon, Marchesa di Riva di Chieri (bap. 24 December 1599 – 10 November 1640), with whom he had four children, legitimised after the wedding but without succession rights:

- Maurizio (died 1645), Marchese di Poirino, Cavalry colonel.
- Margherita (died 1659), Signora of Dronero, Roccabruna e San Giuliano, married Filippo Francesco d’Este, Marchese di San Martino in Rio (ancestors of Maria Teresa Cybo-Malaspina).
- Gabriele (died 1695), Marchese di Riva, Cavalry lieutenant general.
- Antonio (died 1688), Abbot of San Michele della Chiusa (1642), of Santa Maria d’Aulps (1645), of Altacomba (1653), of Fruttuaria di San Benigno (1660) and Casanuova (1687), Lieutenant General of the County of Nice (1672).

In addition, he had several illegitimate children:

— With Luisa de Duyn Maréchal, daughter of Jean-Marie de Duyn, called Maréchal, baron of Val d'Isère:

- Emanuele (1600–1652), Marchese di Andorno and Valle 1621, Governor of Asti and Biella. Knight of the Order of St Maurice and Lazarus.

— With Virginia Pallavicino:

- Carlo Umberto (1601–1663), Marchese di Mulazzano con Gonzole, married Claudia Ferrero-Fieschi, daughter of Francesco Filiberto Ferrrero' Fieschi, prince 1598 of Masserano and Crevacuore.
- Silvio (died 1645), Abbot Commander of Santa Maria d’Entremont (1631), of San Lorenzo fuori le mura d’Ivrea (1642), Governor of Ivrea (1641).
- Vitichindo (d. 1668 or 1674), priest.

— With Argentina Provana, daughter of Giovanni Francesco Provana, count of Bussoleno and Collegno, and Anna Maria Grimaldi:

- Felice (1604–1643), Marchese di Baldissero d’Alba, Signore of Farigliano, Sessanta, Serravalle e Sommariva del Bosco (1629), Lieutenant of the County of Nice 1625/1632.

— With Anna Felizità Cusani:

- Ludovico Cusani (died 1684), Knight of the Order of Saint Maurice and Lazarus.

— With unknown mistress:

- Anna Caterina Meraviglia (died 1660).

== Legacy ==
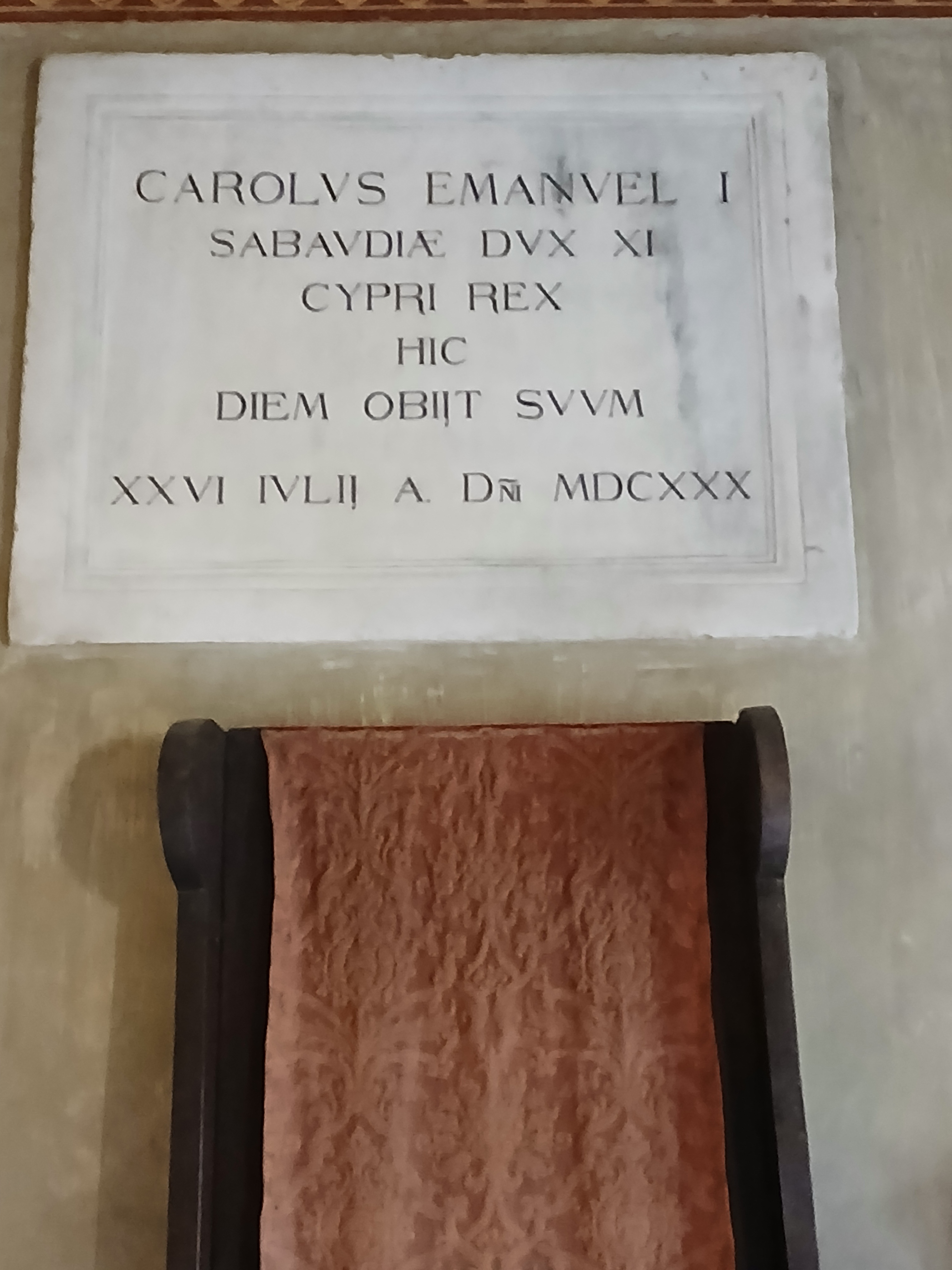
Plaque at Palazzo Cravetta commemorating the death of the duke

Charles Emmanuel's military campaigns ignited Italian nationalism and patriotism.

Alessandro Tassoni took up the defence of Charles Emmanuel. In quick succession he published anonymously two Filippiche addressed to the Italian nobility. He exhorted the nobles to discard their lethargy, unite and instead of fighting each other, join Savoy in ridding Italy of Spanish hegemony.

At about the same time that Tassoni was inspired to write the Filippiche, Fulvio Testi, a young poet at the court of the duke of Este, published a collection of poems dedicated to Charles Emmanuel. Not all the poems were of a patriotic nature, but those that were, clearly revealed the feelings Charles Emmanuel had stirred in freedom-loving Italians.

Vittorio Siri still reminisced more than fifty years later:

All Italy broke forth with pen and tongue in praises and panegyrics at the name of Carlo Emanuele, and in demonstrations of joy and applause that he had revived [...] the ancient Latin valor, wishing that he [...] [might] one day become the redeemer of Italy's freedom and the restorer of its greatness.

== Sources ==
- Kamen, Henry (1997). Philip II. Yale University Press. ISBN 9780300070811.
- Storrs, Christopher (1999). War, Diplomacy and the Rise of Savoy 1690–1720. Cambridge University Press. ISBN 0521551463.
- Symcox, Geoffrey (1997). "From commune to capital: the transformation of Turin, sixteenth to eighteenth centuries". In Oresko, Robert; Gibbs, G. C.; Scott, H. M. (eds.). Royal and Republican Sovereignty in Early Modern Europe: Essays in Memory of Ragnhild Hatton. Cambridge University Press. pp. 242–271. ISBN 9780521419109.
- Vester, Matthew, ed. (2013). Sabaudian Studies: Political Culture, Dynasty, & Territory, 1400–1700. Truman State University Press.

Charles Emmanuel I House of Savoy Born: 12 January 1562 Died: 26 July 1630
Regnal titles
Preceded by Emmanuel Philibert	Duke of Savoy; 1580–1630	Succeeded by Victor Amadeus I
