= Margaret of Valois, Duchess of Berry =

Duchess of Savoy from 1559 to 1574

Margaret of Valois
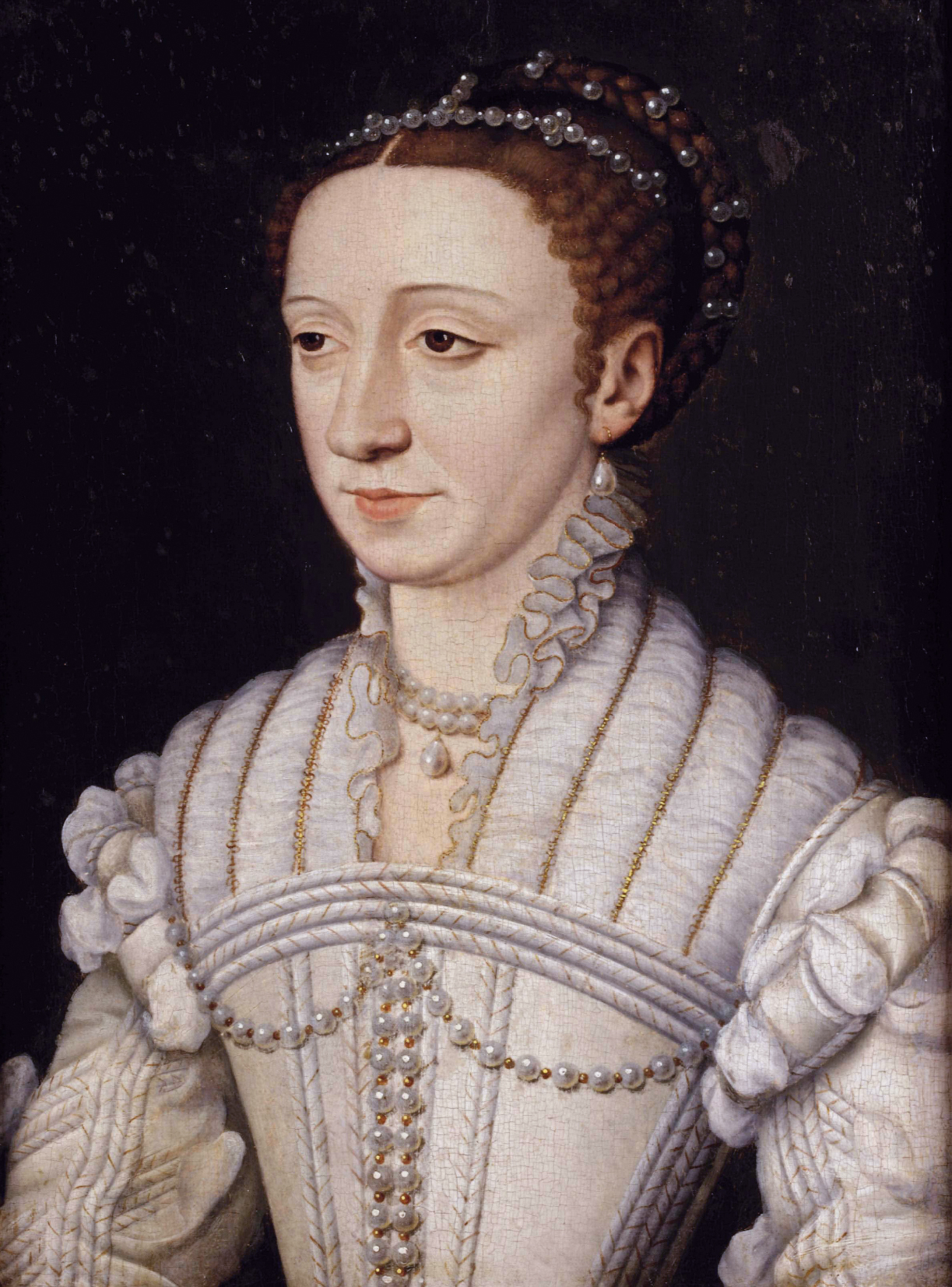
- Portrait by François Clouet

Duchess of Berry
- Tenure: 29 April 1550 – 15 September 1574
- Predecessor: Margaret I
- Successor: Elisabeth

Duchess consort of Savoy
- Tenure: 10 July 1559 – 15 September 1574
- Born: 5 June 1523; Château de Saint-Germain-en-Laye
- Died: 15 September 1574 (aged 51); Turin, Savoy
- Burial: Sacra di San Michele
- Spouse: Emmanuel Philibert, Duke of Savoy (m. 1559)
- Issue: Charles Emmanuel I, Duke of Savoy
- House: Valois-Angoulême
- Father: Francis I of France
- Mother: Claude, Duchess of Brittany

Margaret of Valois, Duchess of Berry (French: Marguerite de Valois) (5 June 1523 – 15 September 1574) was Duchess of Savoy by marriage to Duke Emmanuel Philibert of Savoy. She was the daughter of King Francis I of France and Claude, Duchess of Brittany.

== Biography ==
=== Early life ===
Margaret was born at the Château de Saint-Germain-en-Laye on 5 June 1523 the youngest daughter and child of King Francis I of France and Claude, Duchess of Brittany. Margaret was very close to her paternal aunt, Marguerite of Angoulême, who took care of her and her sister Madeleine during her childhood, and her sister-in-law Catherine de' Medici.

Near the end of 1538, her father and Charles V, Holy Roman Emperor, agreed that Margaret should marry Charles' son, the future Philip II of Spain. However, the agreement between Francis and Charles was short-lived and the marriage never took place.

In 1557 she appointed as lady in waiting Jacqueline d'Entremont, to whom she would remain close with later in life.

On 29 April 1550, at the age of 26, she was created suo jure Duchess of Berry.

=== Duchess consort of Savoy ===
Shortly before her 36th birthday, a marriage was finally arranged for her by her brother King Henry II of France and her former suitor Philip II as part of the terms stipulated in the Treaty of Cateau-Cambrésis which was signed by the ambassadors representing the two monarchs on 3 April 1559. The husband selected for her was Philip's ally, Emmanuel Philibert, Duke of Savoy, Prince of Piedmont. At the time, Margaret was described as having been a "spinster lady of excellent breeding and lively intellect".

The wedding took place in tragic circumstances. On 30 June just three days after her marriage contract had been signed, King Henry was gravely injured during a tournament celebrating the wedding of his eldest daughter Elisabeth to the recently widowed King Philip. A lance wielded by his opponent the Count of Montgomery accidentally struck his helmet at a point beneath the visor and shattered. The wooden splinters deeply penetrated his right eye and entered his brain. Close to death, but still conscious, the king ordered that his sister's marriage should take place immediately, for fear that the Duke of Savoy might profit from his death and renege on the alliance.

The ceremony did not take place in Notre Dame Cathedral as had been planned. Instead it was a solemn, subdued event conducted at midnight on 9 July in Saint Paul's, a small church not far from the Tournelles Palace where Margaret's dying brother was ensconced. Among the few guests was the French queen consort Catherine de' Medici who sat by herself, weeping. King Henry died the following day.

== Children ==
Margaret and her husband had only one surviving child: Charles Emmanuel I, Duke of Savoy who was born in January 1562, when Margaret was 38 years of age. He later married Infanta Catherine Michelle of Spain, the daughter of King Philip by his marriage to Margaret's niece, Elisabeth of Valois.

== Death ==
Margaret died on 14 September 1574 at the age of 51. She was buried in Turin at the Cathedral of Saint Giovanni Battista.

== Gallery ==
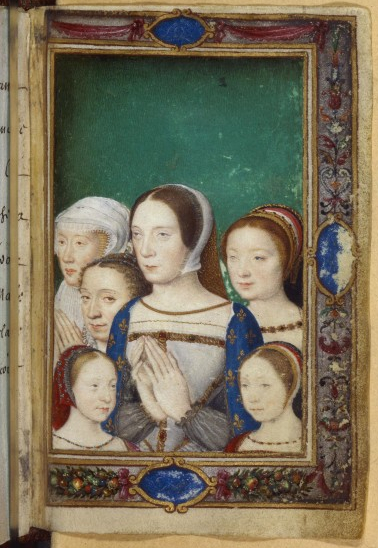
Margaret (shown far right), her mother and her sisters

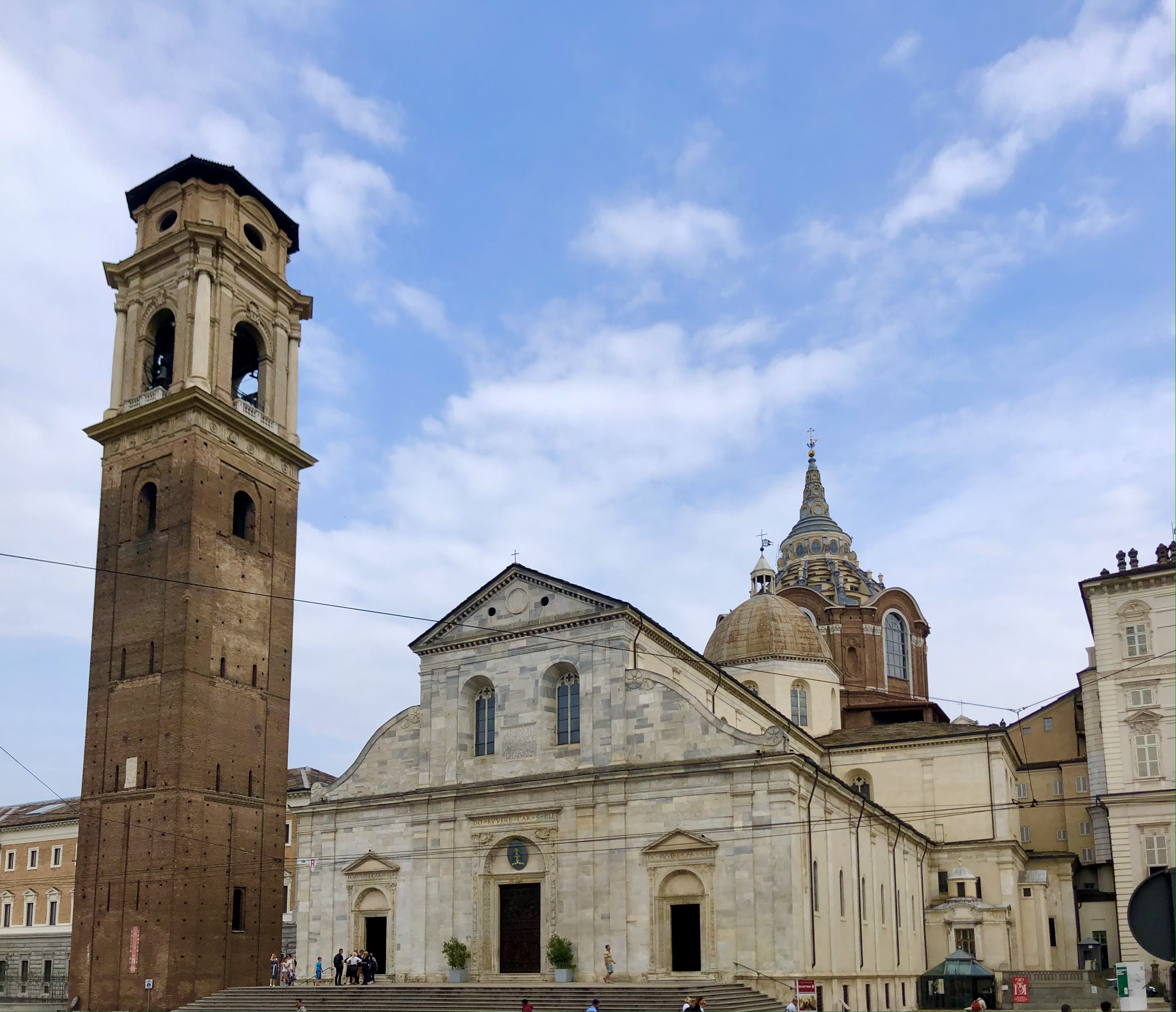
Cathedral of Saint Giovanni Battista, Turin, Margaret's burial place

== See also ==
- Peace of Cateau Cambrésis
- Duke of Berry

Margaret of Valois, Duchess of Berry House of Valois, Orléans-Angoulême branch Cadet branch of the Capetian dynasty Born: 5 June 1523 Died: 15 September 1574
Royal titles
Vacant Title last held by Beatrice of Portugal	Duchess consort of Savoy; 1559–1574	Vacant Title next held by Catalina Micaela of Spain
French nobility
Vacant Title last held by Margaret of Angoulême	Duchess of Berry; 1550–1574	Vacant Title next held by Elisabeth of Austria
