= Philip Emmanuel, Prince of Piedmont =

Philip Emmanuel
- Prince of Piedmont
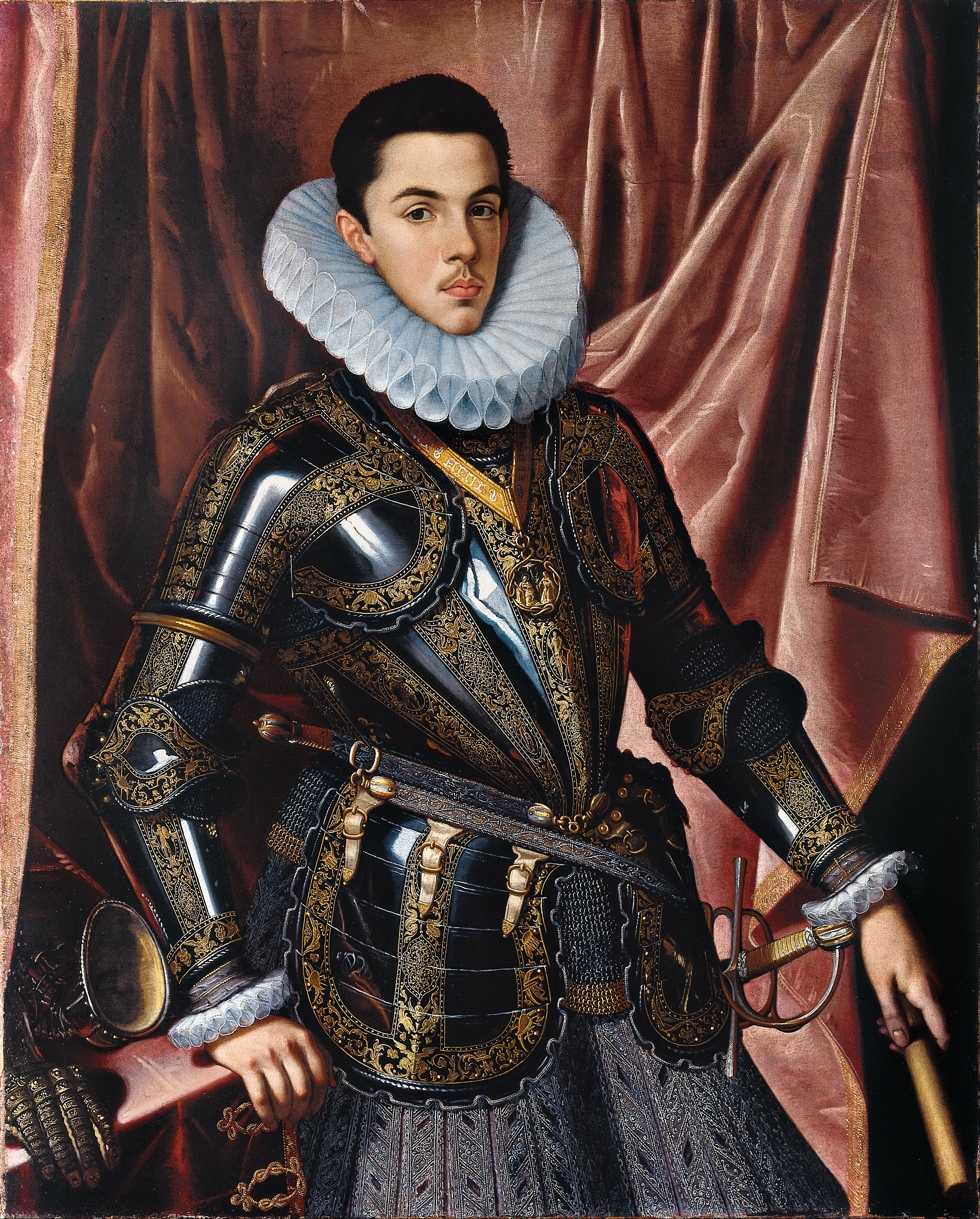
- Portrait by Juan Pantoja de la Cruz
- Born: 2 April 1586
- Died: 9 February 1605 (aged 18); Valladolid, Spain
Names
- Filippo Emanuele di Savoia
- Dynasty: Savoy
- Father: Charles Emmanuel I, Duke of Savoy
- Mother: Catalina Micaela of Spain

Philip Emmanuel, Prince of Piedmont (2 April 1586 – 9 February 1605) was the eldest son of Charles Emmanuel I, Duke of Savoy and Infanta Catalina Micaela of Spain.

== Early years ==
Philip Emmanuel's parents Charles Emmanuel I, Duke of Savoy and Infanta Catalina Micaela of Spain were married in Zaragoza in 1585. Catalina Micaela conceived quickly and gave birth to Philip Emmanuel on 2 April 1586. As heir to the Duchy of Savoy, he was styled as Prince of Piedmont. Following the birth of his brother Victor Amadeus in 1587, Philip Emmanuel was baptised with him in Turin and educated in his parents' court in his early years. Having given birth to ten children, Catalina Micaela died in childbirth in 1597.

== Arrival in Spain ==
After signing the Treaty of Lyon in 1601 with Henry IV of France, Charles Emmanuel I aimed to improve his relations with his brother-in-law Philip III of Spain. In order to complete the education of his eldest sons, he sent the boys to the Spanish court. Philip Emmanuel, along with his brothers Victor Amadeus and Emmanuel Philibert, arrived in Valladolid, where the court was established at the time, at the end of August 1603. In October, their uncle Philip III gave each of them their own house.

== Death ==
Philip Emmanuel died in Valladolid on 9 February 1605, as a result of smallpox, which was common at the time. Following his death, his brother Victor Amadeus was styled as Prince of Piedmont and later became Duke of Savoy.

== Gallery ==
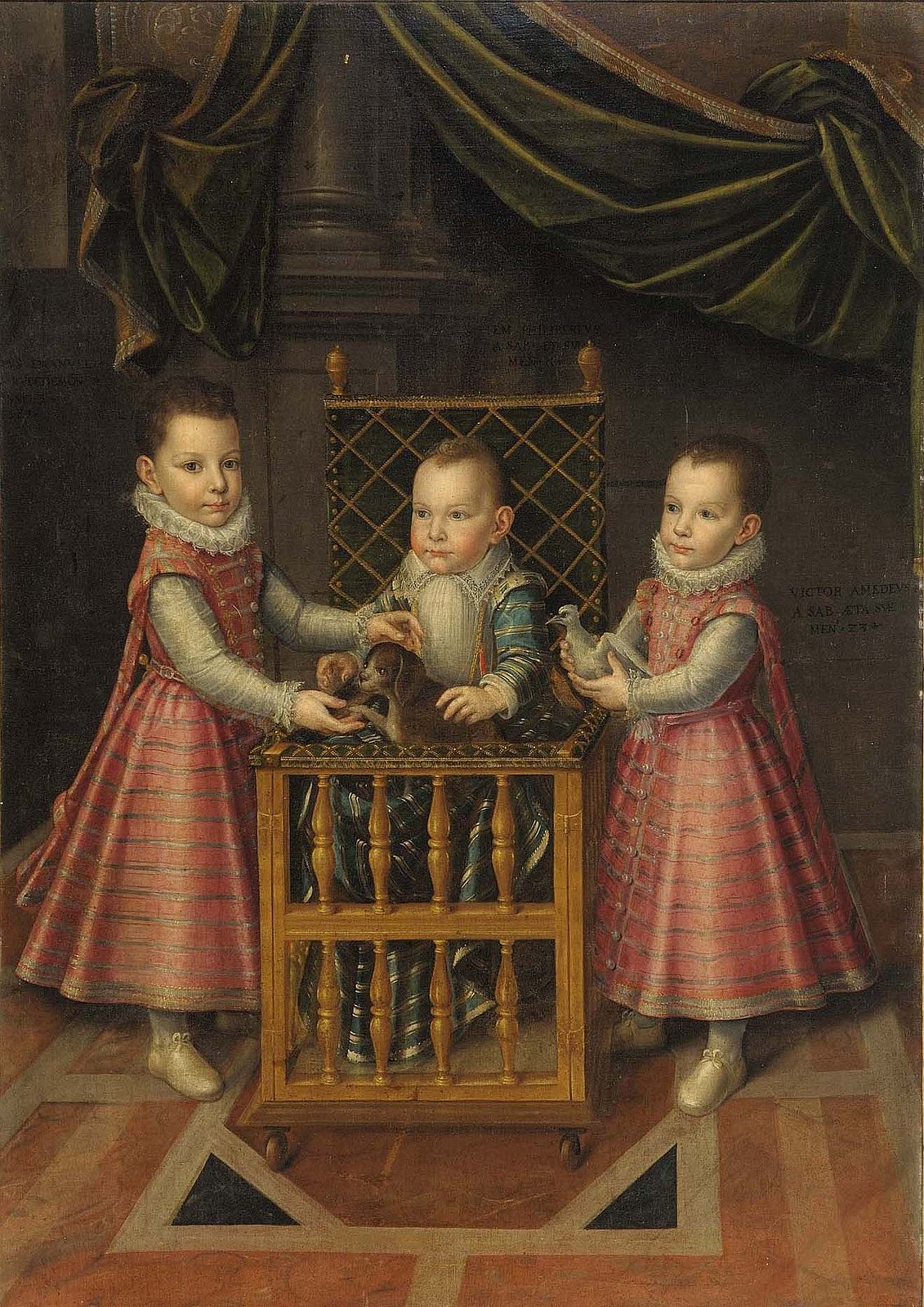
Portrait of Philip Emmanuel and his brothers Emmanuel Philibert and Victor Amadeus

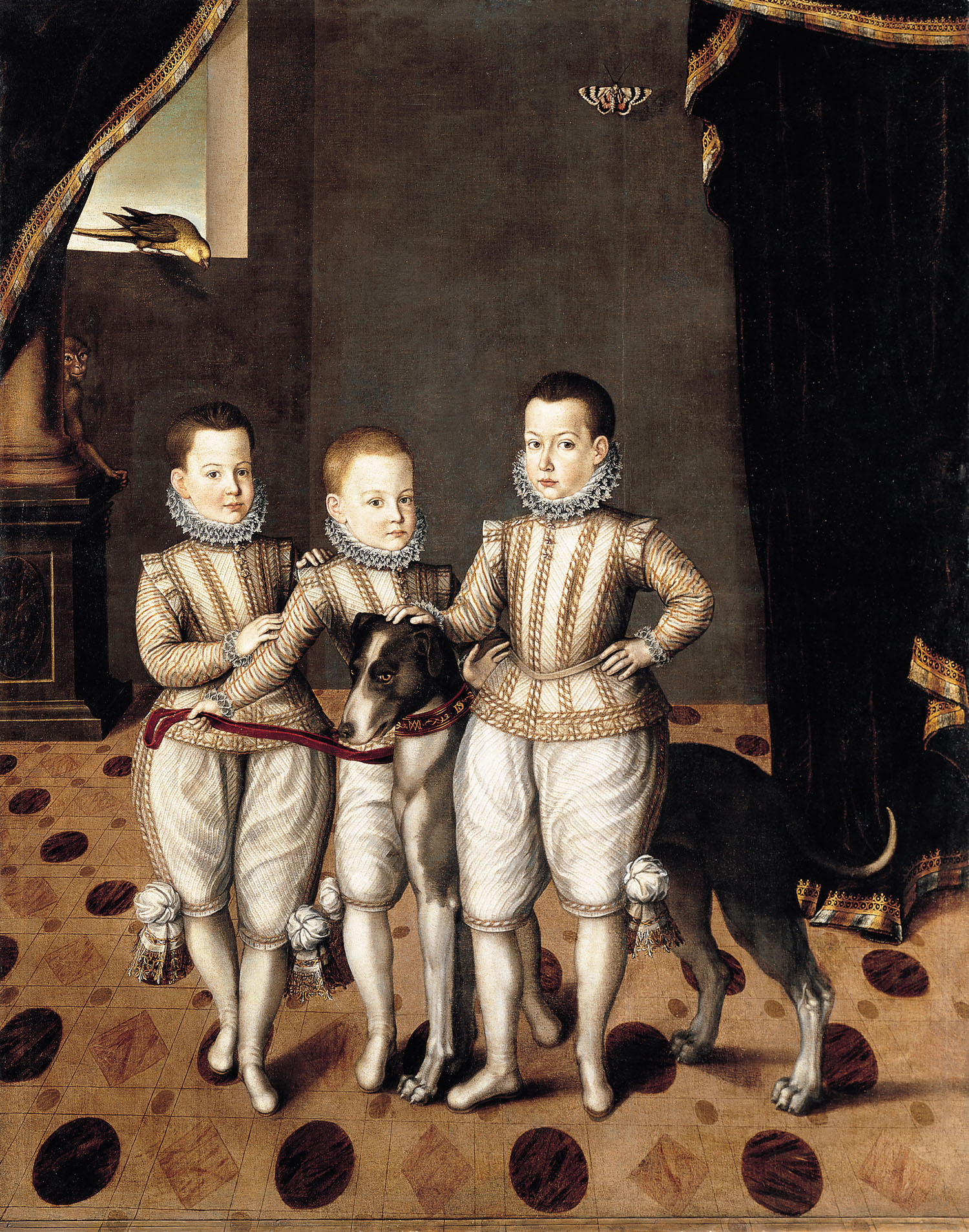
Philip Emmanuel and his brothers

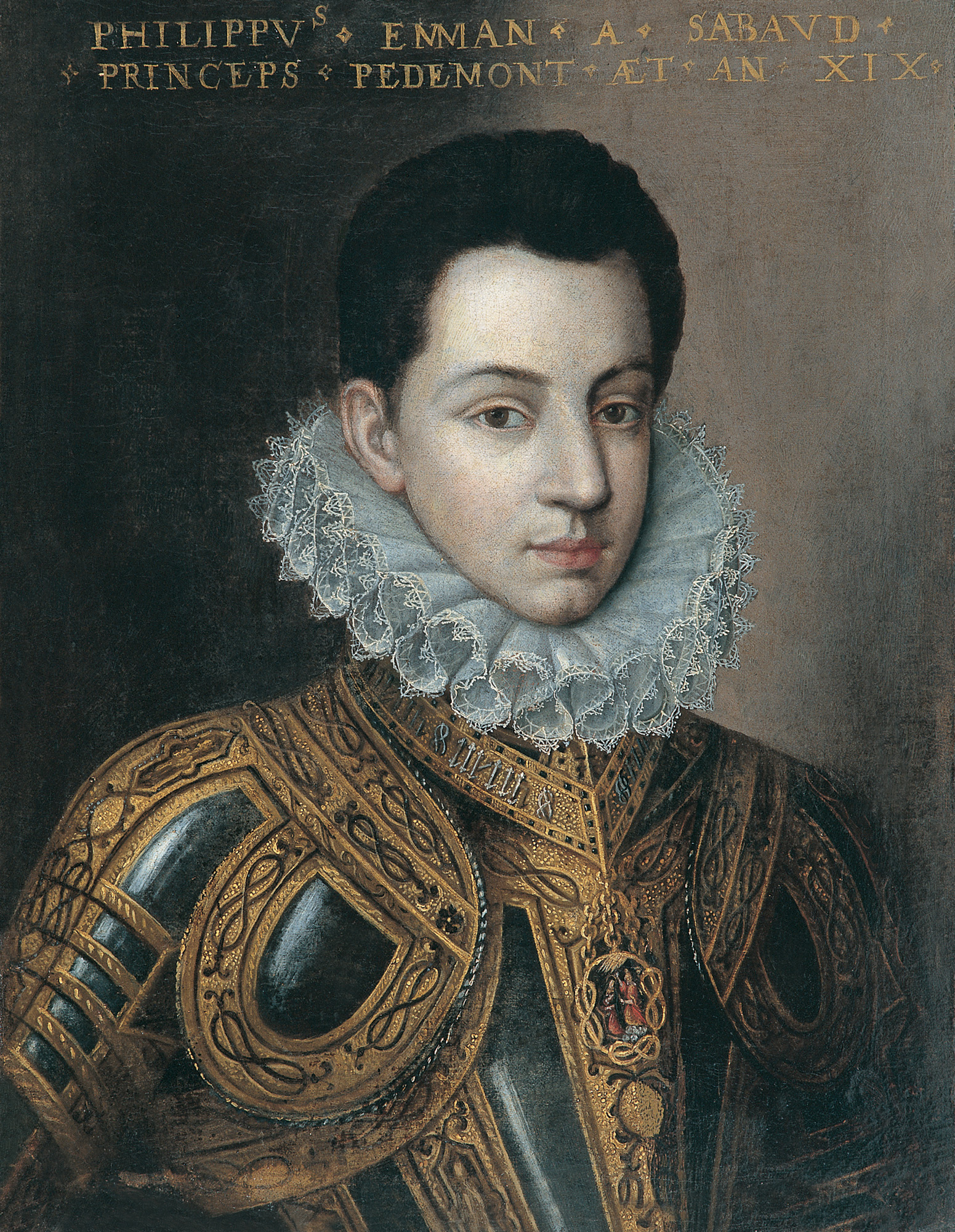
Philip Emmanuel wearing the order of Santissima Annunziata garland
