= Emmanuel Philibert, Duke of Savoy =

Duke of Savoy from 1553 to 1580

Emmanuel Philibert
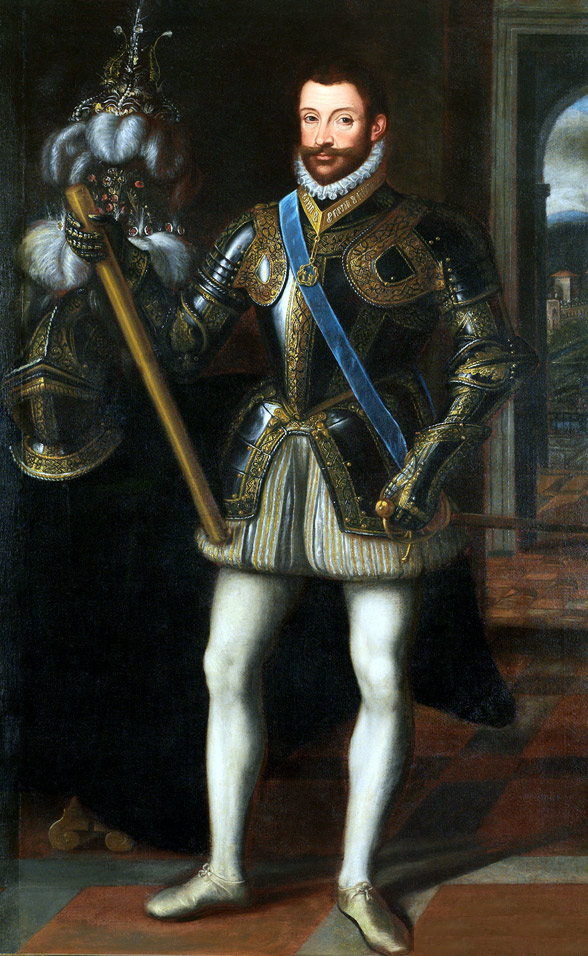
- Portrait by Giacomo Vighi, 1568–1573 (17th-century copy)

Duke of Savoy
- Reign: 17 August 1553 – 30 August 1580
- Predecessor: Charles III
- Successor: Charles Emmanuel I
- Born: 8 July 1528; Chambéry, Savoy
- Died: 30 August 1580 (aged 52); Turin, Savoy
- Burial: Chapel of the Holy Shroud
- Spouse: Margaret of Valois, Duchess of Berry (m. 1559; died 1574)
- Issue: Charles Emmanuel I
- House: Savoy
- Father: Charles III of Savoy
- Mother: Beatrice of Portugal
- Religion: Catholic Church

Emmanuel Philibert (Italian: Emanuele Filiberto; Piedmontese: Emanuel Filibert; 8 July 1528 – 30 August 1580), known as Testa di ferro (Piedmontese: Testa 'd fer; "Ironhead", because of his military career), was the Duke of Savoy and ruler of the Savoyard states from 17 August 1553 until his death in 1580. He is notably remembered for restoring the Savoyard state, which had been occupied by France since his youth, following his triumph at the Battle of St. Quentin in 1557, and for transferring the capital to Turin.

== Biography ==
=== Early life ===
Born in Chambéry, Emmanuel Philibert was the only child of Charles III, Duke of Savoy, and Beatrice of Portugal to reach adulthood. His mother was sister-in-law to Charles V, Holy Roman Emperor, and the future duke served in Charles's army during the war against Francis I of France, distinguishing himself by capturing Hesdin in July 1553.

=== Reign ===
A month later, his father died, and he became Duke of Savoy on the death of his father, but this was a nearly empty honour, as the vast majority of his hereditary lands had been occupied and administered by the French since 1536. Instead, he continued to serve the Habsburgs in hopes of recovering his lands, and served his cousin Philip II of Spain as Governor of the Netherlands from 1555 to 1559.

In this capacity, he personally led the Spanish invasion of northern France and won a brilliant victory at Saint-Quentin on 10 August 1557. He was also a suitor to Lady Elizabeth Tudor (the future Queen Elizabeth I), daughter of Henry VIII of England. Emmanuel Philibert finally recovered his lands following the Peace of Cateau Cambrésis signed between France and Spain in 1559, and he married his first cousin once removed, Margaret of Valois, Duchess of Berry, the sister of King Henry II of France. Their only child was Charles Emmanuel I of Savoy.

==== Portuguese War of Succession ====
After the death of his uncle, Henry I of Portugal, on 31 January 1580, Emmanuel Philibert fought to impose his rights as a claimant to the Portuguese throne. However, he soon realized that he had quite a fragile position due to the claims of Philip II, who gained control of the country, thus uniting Spain and Portugal.

=== Later Reign ===
Emmanuel Philibert spent his rule regaining what had been lost in the costly wars with France. A skilled political strategist, he took advantage of various squabbles in Europe to slowly regain territory from both the French and the Spanish, including the city of Turin. He also purchased two territories. Internally, he moved his political capital from Chambéry to Turin and replaced Latin as the official language with French in the Duchy of Savoy and the Duchy of Aosta and with Italian in the Principality of Piedmont and the County of Nice. He was attempting to acquire the marquisate of Saluzzo when he died in Turin. Later, he was buried in the Chapel of the Holy Shroud of the Turin Cathedral, to which he had moved the Sindone in 1578.

== Gallery ==
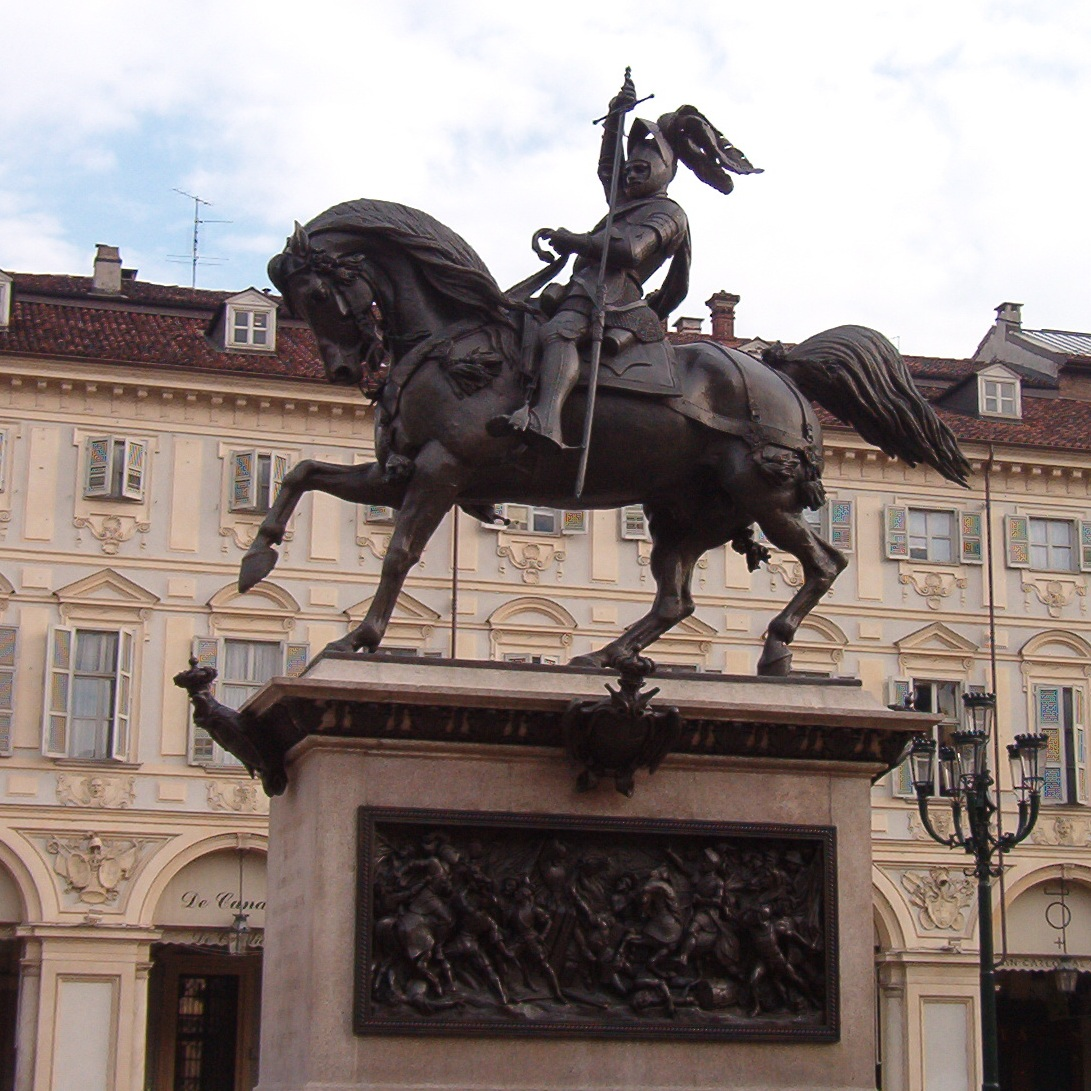
The Caval ëd Brons ("Bronze horse"), monument to Emmanuel Philibert in Turin

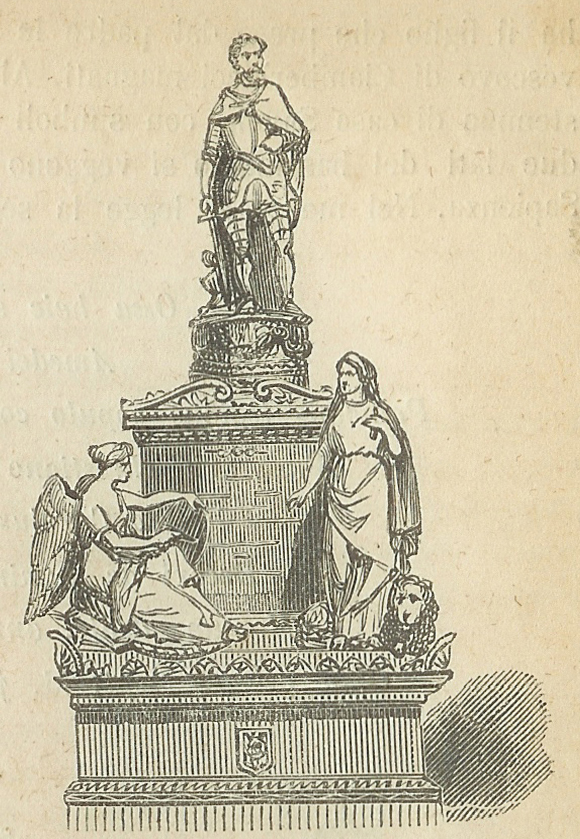
Representation of the tomb monument

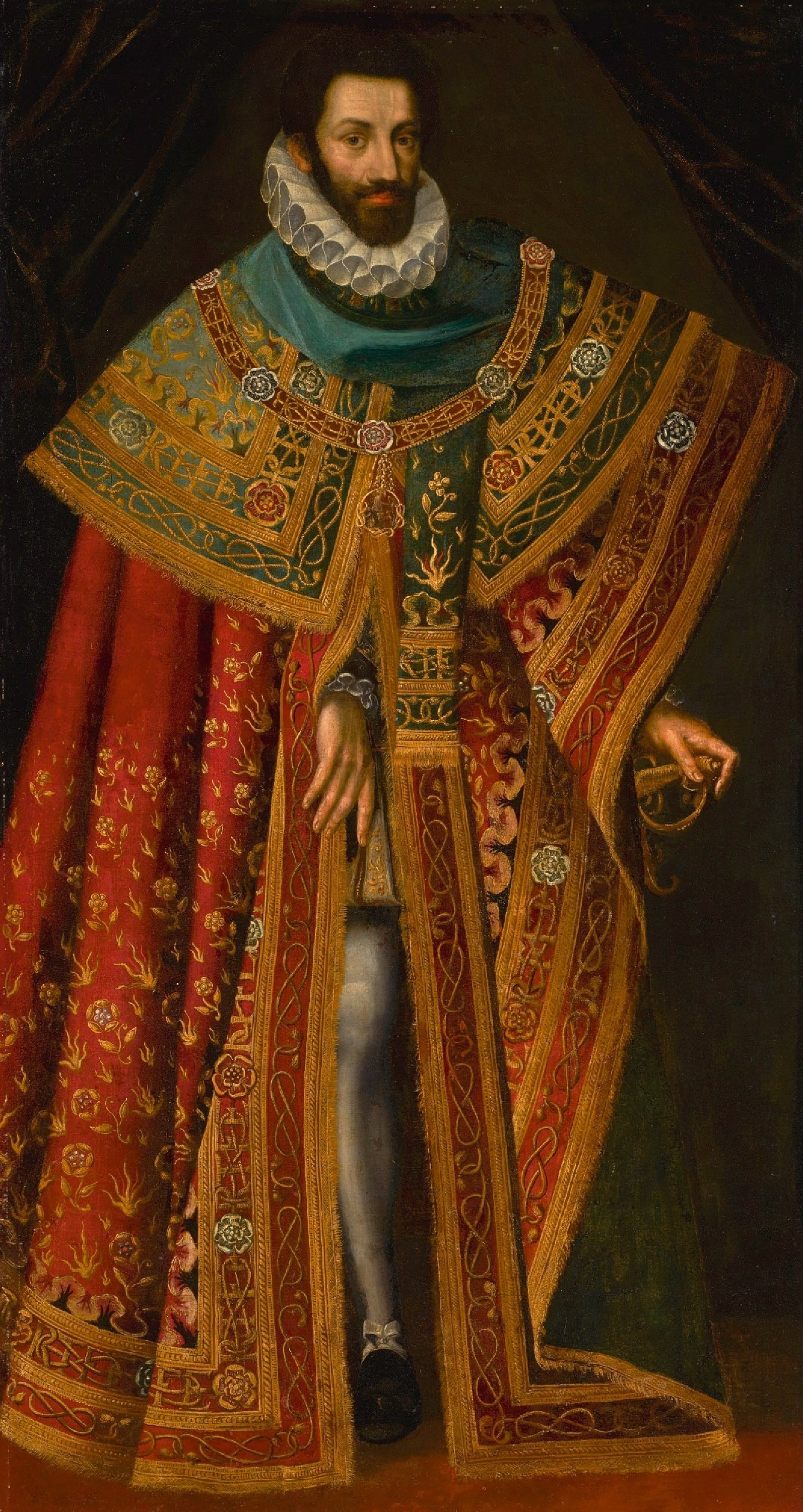
Portrait of Emmanuel Philibert by Giacomo Vighi, in the robes of Grand Master of the Supreme Order of the Most Holy Annunciation

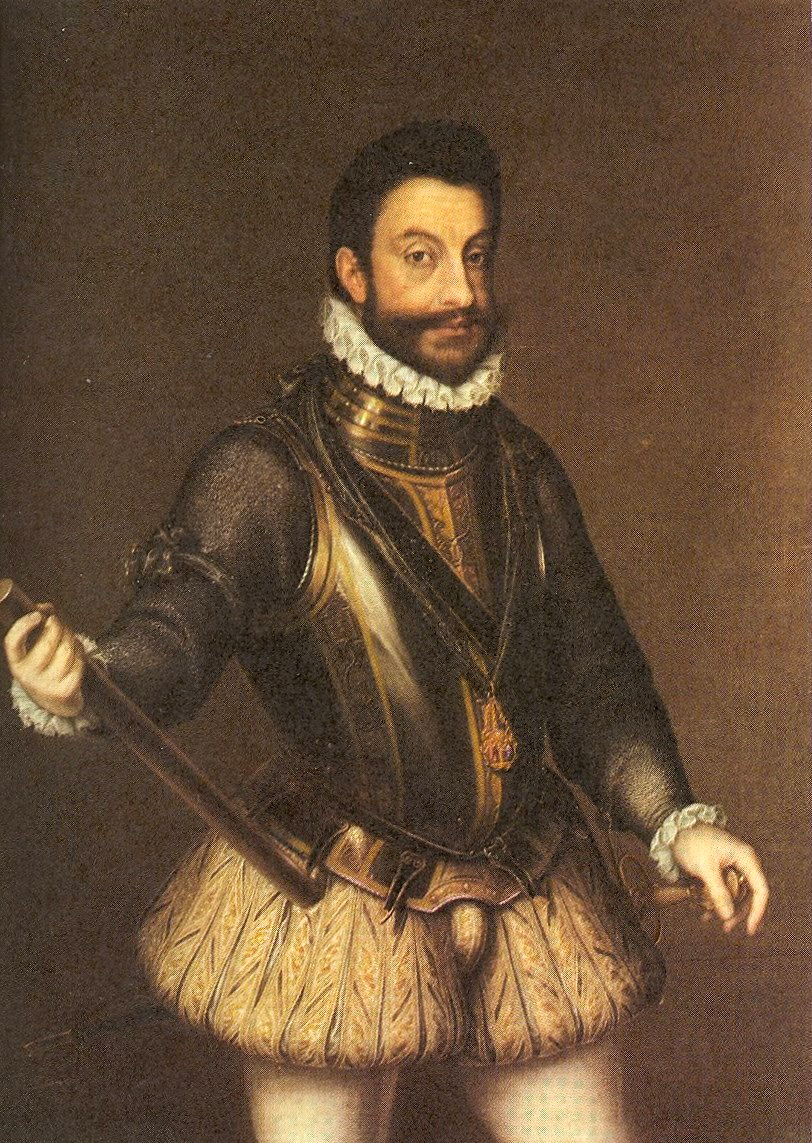
Portrait attributed to Giorgio Soleri

== Ancestry ==
Ancestors of Emmanuel Philibert, Duke of Savoy

8. Louis, Duke of Savoy
4. Philip II, Duke of Savoy
9. Anne of Cyprus
2. Charles III, Duke of Savoy
10. Jean II de Brosse, Lord of Boussac
5. Claudine de Brosse
11. Nicole de Châtillon, Countess of Penthièvre
1. Emmanuel Philibert, Duke of Savoy
12. Ferdinand, Duke of Viseu
6. Manuel I of Portugal
13. Beatrice of Portugal
3. Beatrice of Portugal
14. Ferdinand II of Aragon
7. Maria of Aragon
15. Isabella I of Castile

== Sources ==
- Kamen, Henry (1997). Philip of Spain. Yale University Press. ISBN 9780300070811.
- Leathes, Stanley; Prothero, G. W.; Ward, Sir Adolphus William, eds. (1964). Cambridge Modern History. Vol. 1. Cambridge University Press.
- Vester, Matthew, ed. (2013). Sabaudian Studies: Political Culture, Dynasty, & Territory, 1400–1700. Truman State University Press.

== See also ==
- 1580 Portuguese succession crisis

Emmanuel Philibert, Duke of Savoy House of Savoy Born: 8 July 1528 Died: 30 August 1580
Regnal titles
Preceded by Charles III	Duke of Savoy; 1553–1580	Succeeded by Charles Emmanuel I
Political offices
Preceded by Mary of Austria	Governor of the Netherlands; 1555–1559	Succeeded by Margaret of Parma
