= Catalina Micaela of Spain =

Duchess of Savoy from 1585 to 1597

Catalina Micaela
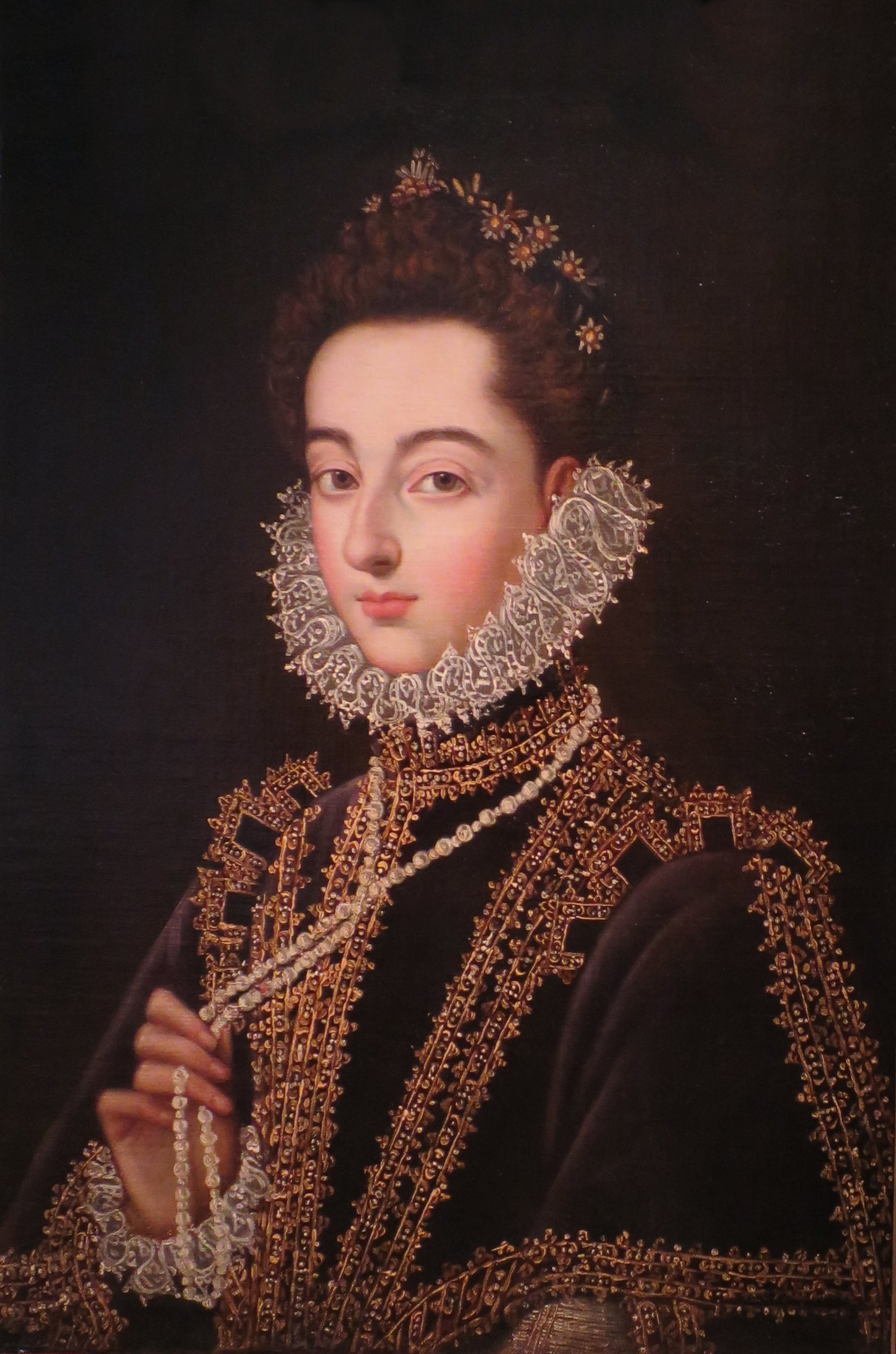
- Portrait by Alonso Sánchez Coello (between 1582 and 1585)

Duchess consort of Savoy
- Tenure: 11 March 1585 – 6 November 1597
- Born: 10 October 1567; Madrid, Crown of Castile
- Died: 6 November 1597 (aged 30); Turin, Duchy of Savoy
- Burial: Turin Cathedral
- Spouse: Charles Emmanuel I, Duke of Savoy (m. 1585)
- Issue more...: Philip Emmanuel, Prince of Piedmont; Victor Amadeus I, Duke of Savoy; Emanuel Filibert, Viceroy of Sicily; Margaret, Duchess of Mantua; Isabella, Hereditary Princess of Modena; Maurice of Savoy; Thomas Francis, Prince of Carignano
- House: Habsburg
- Father: Philip II of Spain
- Mother: Elisabeth of Valois

Catalina Micaela of Spain (10 October 1567 – 6 November 1597) was Duchess of Savoy by marriage to Charles Emmanuel I, Duke of Savoy. She ruled the duchy several times as regent in Charles Emmanuel's absence, notably during his campaign in 1594. She was the younger surviving daughter of Philip II of Spain and Elisabeth of Valois.

== Early life ==
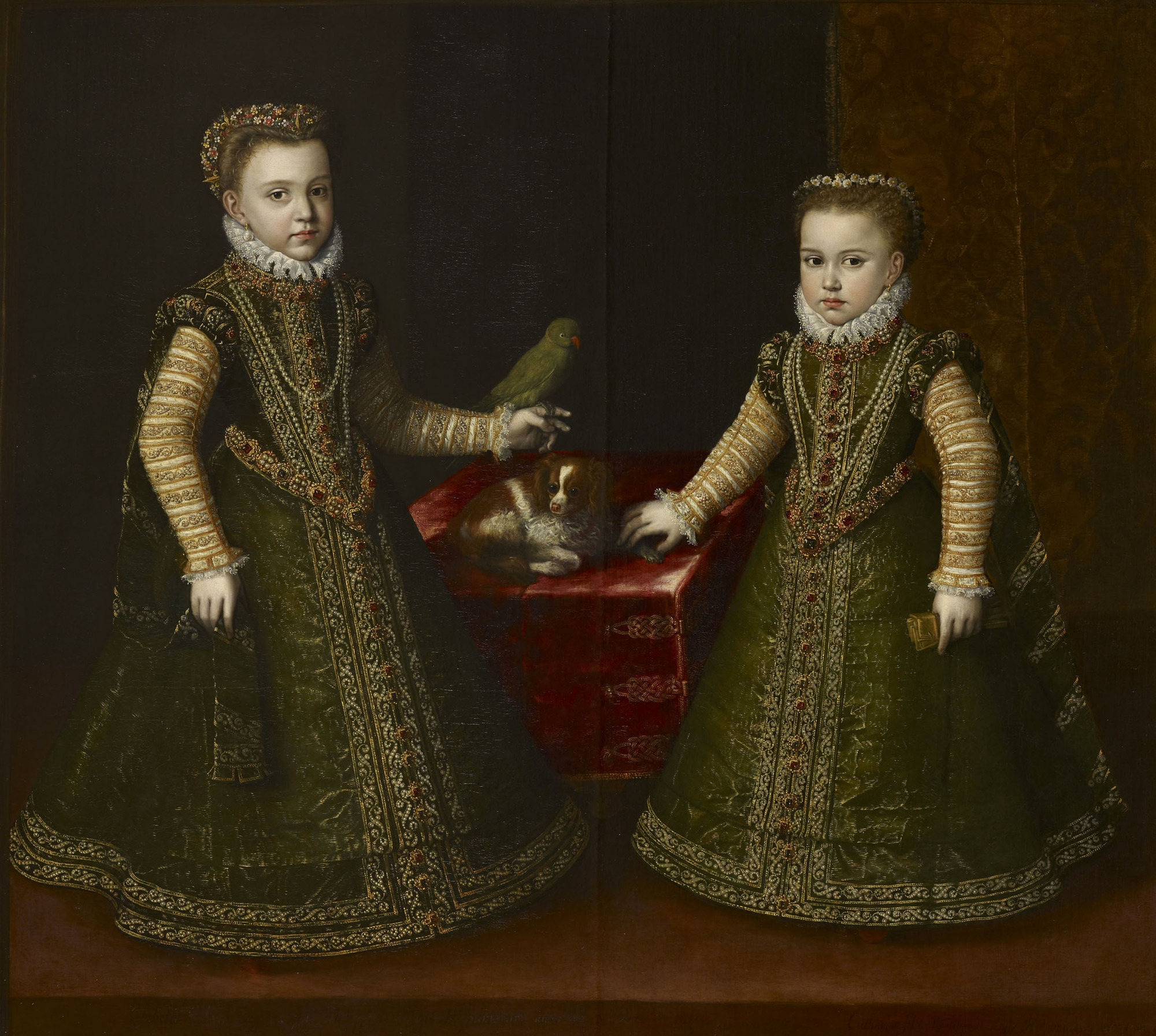
Catalina and her elder sister Isabella in a 1570 portrait by Sofonisba Anguissola

Catalina Micaela was the daughter of Philip II, ruler of the vast Spanish Empire, and his third wife, the French princess Elisabeth of Valois.

She was described as beautiful, intelligent, arrogant and well aware of her high social status. Though her father did not attend her christening and was not as rejoiced at the birth of a daughter as he had been with her elder sister, Isabella Clara Eugenia, she had a good relationship with him. Philip and Catalina Micaela exchanged letters throughout her life.

She had a close relationship with her sister. They were raised together under the care of Margarita de Cardona, the lady-in-waiting of their stepmother, Anna of Austria, and some of her mother's own ladies such as Claude de Vineulx. Her grandmother Catherine de' Medici was given regular reports of Catalina and her sister, and she had their portraits sent and put in her book of hours. She was probably named after Catherine de Medici.

== Duchess of Savoy ==
Charles Emmanuel I, Duke of Savoy suggested that he should marry Catalina Micaela as a way of gaining Spanish support for his plans to expand Savoy on the coast of France, weakened from the Wars of Religion. The wedding took place in Zaragoza on 11 March 1585, and the couple made their entrance to Turin in Savoy on 10 August 1585. On 1 August 1591, Charles Emmanuel and Catalina Micaela appointed Tomás Fernández de Medrano as their Secretary of State and War, a move that proved pivotal for relations between the Duchy of Savoy and the Spanish Monarchs.

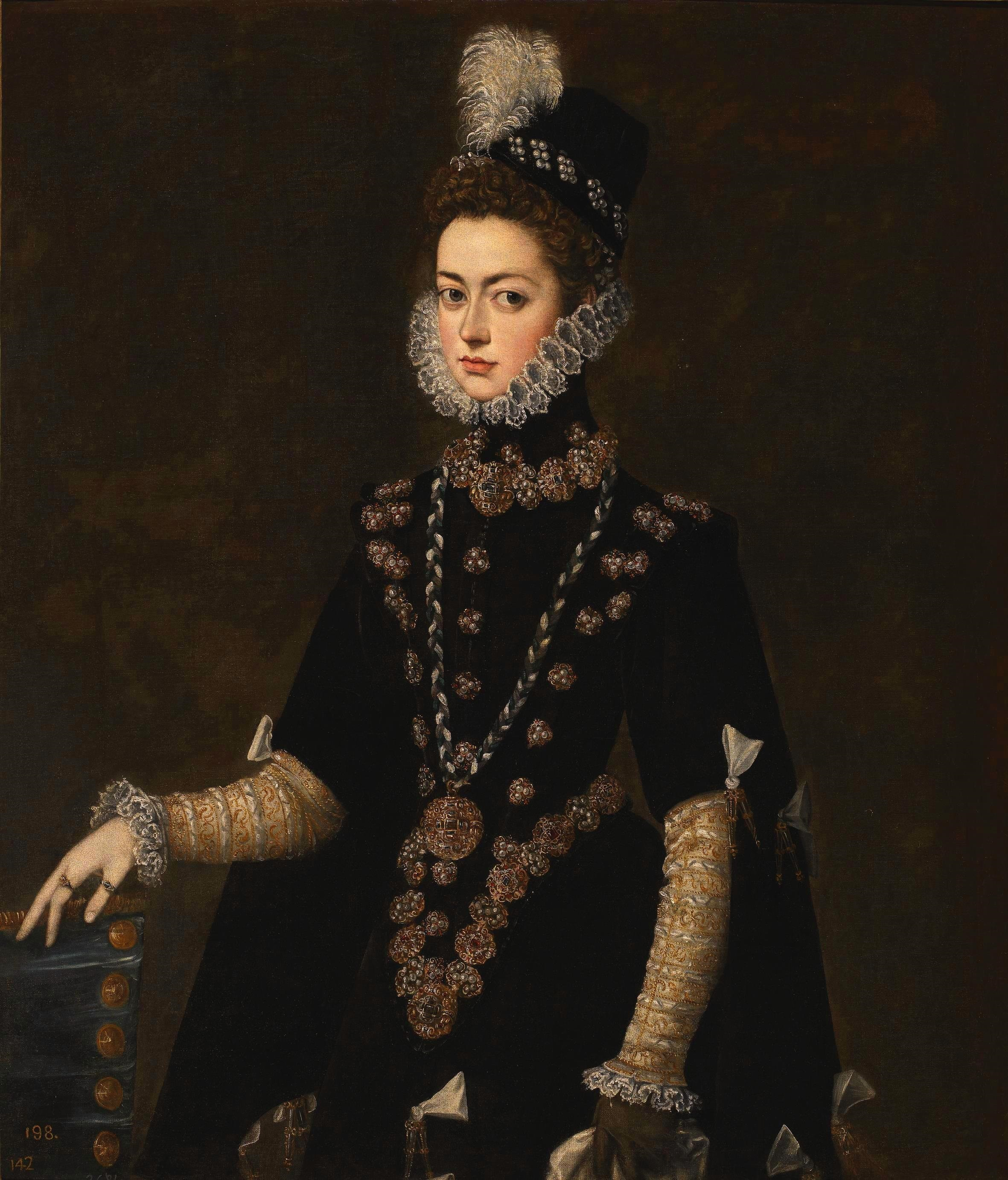
Portrait of Duchess Catalina by Juan Pantoja de la Cruz, c. 1585

Catalina Micaela was initially unpopular because of her arrogance and attempts to introduce Spanish pomp, ceremony and way of dress to the court in Turin. However, she soon gained respect because of her political and diplomatic skill, which she used to defend the autonomy of Savoy against Spain. She refused the Spanish offer to install a Spanish garrison in Turin from Milan with the excuse of giving her a life guard.

She is reported to have had great influence on Charles Emmanuel I and to have reformed him for the better. She also served as regent several times during the absence of the duke on military campaigns, such as during the Lyon campaign in 1594. Catalina Micaela also benefited cultural life in Savoy, founded many new buildings including an art gallery. Due to her influence, her sons were educated in Spain.

Catalina Micaela died in childbirth near the end of 1597. She had been constantly pregnant during much of her twelve years of marriage, giving birth almost once per year, and she had miscarried earlier that year. Her death is said to have hastened the death of her elderly father, who died the following year.

== Issue ==
In 1585, Catalina Micaela married Charles Emmanuel I, Duke of Savoy. They had:

- Philip Emmanuel, Prince of Piedmont (1586–1605)
- Victor Amadeus I, Duke of Savoy (1587–1637)
- Emmanuel Philibert of Savoy (1588–1624), Spanish Viceroy of Sicily (1622–24)
- Margaret (1589–1655), married Francesco IV Gonzaga of Mantua
- Isabella (1591–1626), married Alfonso III d'Este, duke of Modena
- Maurice, a cardinal (1593–1657)
- Maria Apollonia, a nun in Rome (1594–1656)
- Francesca Caterina, a nun in Biella (1595–1640)
- Thomas Francis, Prince of Carignano (1596–1656), married Marie, daughter Charles Bourbon, count of Soissons
- Giovanna (born and died 1597)

== Ancestry ==
Ancestors of Catalina Micaela of Spain

8. Philip the Handsome, King of Castile
4. Charles V, Holy Roman Emperor
9. Joanna of Castile
2. Philip II of Spain
10. Manuel I of Portugal
5. Isabella of Portugal
11. Maria of Aragon
1. Catalina Micaela of Spain
12. Francis I of France
6. Henry II of France
13. Claude, Duchess of Brittany
3. Elisabeth of Valois
14. Lorenzo II de' Medici, Duke of Urbino
7. Catherine de' Medici
15. Madeleine de la Tour d'Auvergne

== Sources ==
- Bercé, Yves-Marie (1996). The Birth of Absolutism: A History of France, 1598-1661. MacMillan Press Ltd.
- Pitts, Vincent Joseph (2009). Henri IV of France: His Reign and Age. Johns Hopkins University Press.
- Rapelli, Paola (2011). Symbols of Power in Art. Getty Publications.
- Raviola, Blythe Alice (2016). "The Three Lives of Margherita of Savoy-Gonzaga, Duchess of Mantua and Vicereine of Portugal". In Cruz, Anne J.; Stampino, Maria Galli (eds.). Early Modern Habsburg Women: Transnational Contexts, Cultural Conflicts, Dynastic Continuities. Routledge. pp. 59–78. ISBN 9781317146926.
- Symcox, Geoffrey (1997). "From commune to capital: the transformation of Turin, sixteenth to eighteenth centuries". In Oresko, Robert; Gibbs, G. C.; Scott, H. M. (eds.). Royal and Republican Sovereignty in Early Modern Europe: Essays in Memory of Ragnhild Hatton. Cambridge University Press. pp. 242–271. ISBN 9780521419109.

Catalina Micaela of Spain House of Habsburg Born: 10 October 1567 Died: 6 November 1597
Royal titles
Vacant Title last held by Margaret of France	Duchess consort of Savoy; 18 March 1585 – 6 November 1597	Vacant Title next held by Christine of France
