= Giorgio Soleri =

Italian painter of the Renaissance

Giorgio Soleri was an Italian painter. Giorgio's son, Raffaele Angelo Soleri, was also a painter. The source indicates only two authenticated works of Soleri: a Virgin who places the city of Alessandria under her protection and St Lawrence genuflects to the Madonna from a church in Casale.
