= Elisabeth of Valois =

Queen of Spain from 1559 to 1568

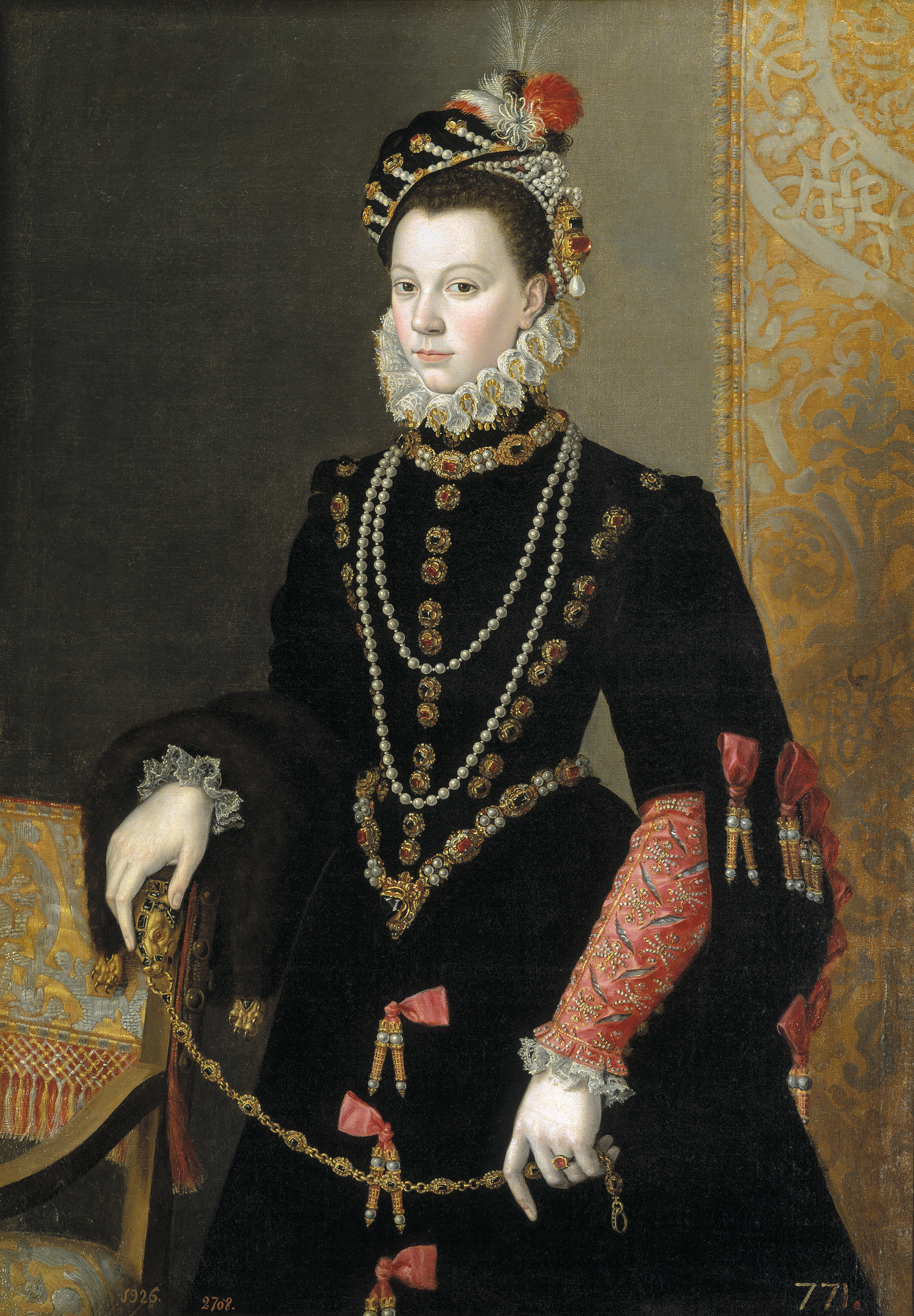
- Portrait by Juan Pantoja de la Cruz, c. 1605

Queen consort of Spain
- Tenure: 22 June 1559 – 3 October 1568
- Born: 2 April 1546; Palace of Fontainebleau, France
- Died: 3 October 1568 (aged 22); Royal Palace of Aranjuez, Spain
- Burial: El Escorial
- Spouse: Philip II of Spain (m. 1559)
- Issue more...: Isabella Clara Eugenia, Lady of the Netherlands; Catalina Micaela, Duchess of Savoy
- House: Valois-Angoulême
- Father: Henry II of France
- Mother: Catherine de' Medici

Elisabeth of France, or Elisabeth of Valois (Spanish: Isabel de Valois; French: Élisabeth de Valois; 2 April 1546 – 3 October 1568), was Queen of Spain as the third wife of Philip II of Spain.

== Early life ==
Elisabeth was born in the Château de Fontainebleau, the eldest daughter of Henry II of France and Catherine de' Medici. She was raised under the supervision of the governor and governess of the royal children, Jean d'Humières and Françoise d'Humières. During childhood, she was called "Ysabel".

Elisabeth's childhood was spent in the French royal nursery, where her father insisted she share her bedroom with her future sister-in-law, Mary, Queen of Scots, who was about three years older. Although Elisabeth had to give precedence to Mary (since Mary was already a crowned queen), the two would remain close friends for the rest of their lives.

Her lady-in-waiting, Claude de Vineulx, accompanied her to Spain and often wrote reports of Elisabeth's health to Catherine. She was described as being shy, timid and very much in awe of her formidable mother, even as there is evidence in letters that Catherine was tender and loving towards her. While it is acknowledged that her sister Margaret and her future sister-in-law Mary were both prettier than she, Elisabeth was nevertheless still considered one of Catherine's attractive daughters.

In 1550, Elisabeth's father, Henry, began negotiations for her betrothal to the 13-year-old Edward VI of England to take effect when she came of age. This arrangement brought condemnation from Pope Julius III due to Edward being Protestant, and Julius reportedly stated that he would excommunicate both (Note: The text says "Henry and Elisabeth?") if Edward and Elisabeth married. Henry, undeterred, agreed to a dowry of 200,000 écus in July 1551, but Edward died in 1553 while Elisabeth was still a child.

== Queen of Spain ==
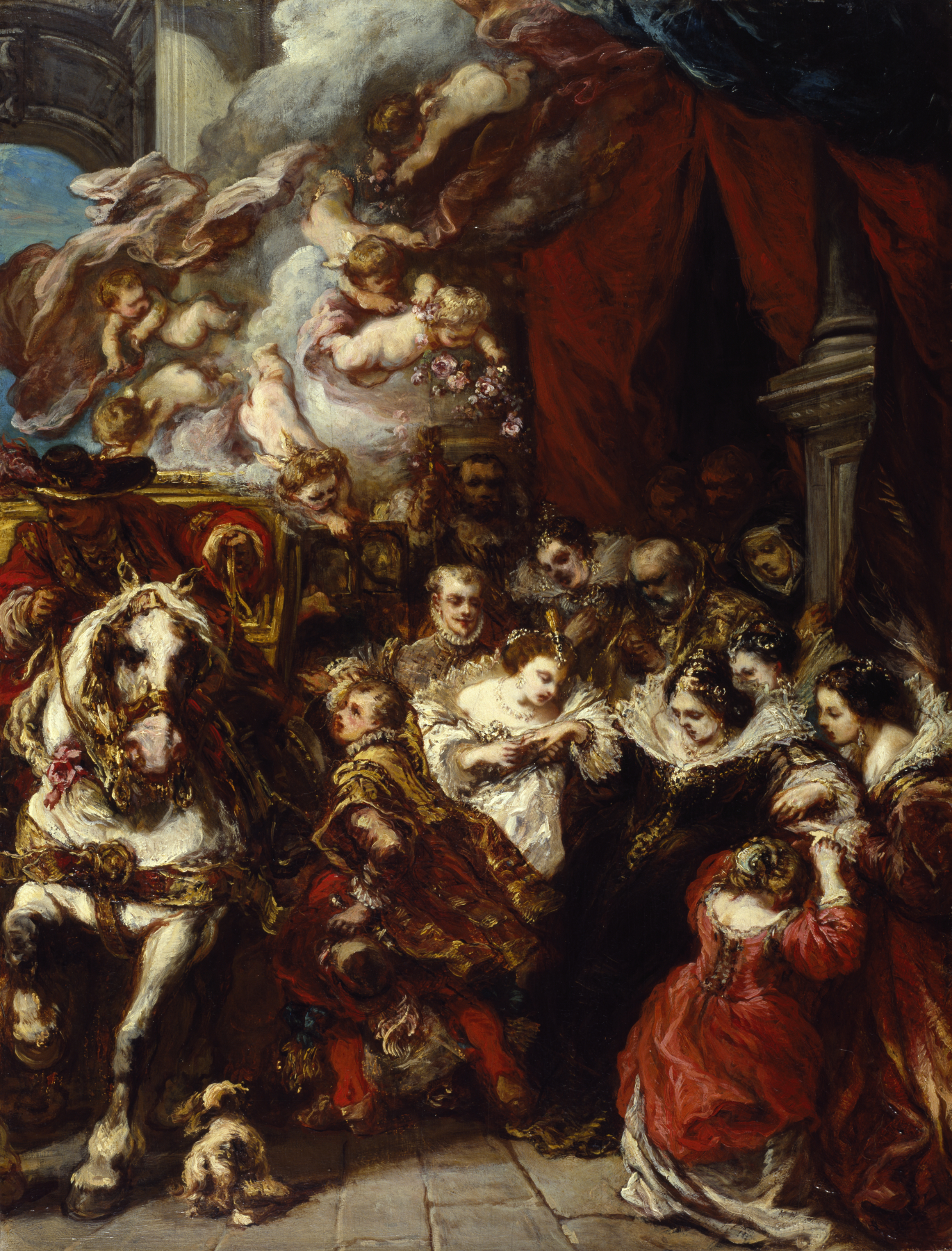
This painting by Eugène Isabey depicts Elisabeth, dressed more like a widow than a bride, swooning as she is led to the carriage that will bear her away from France to marry King Philip II of Spain. The Walters Art Museum

Elisabeth married Philip II of Spain on 22 June 1559. Originally married via proxy at Notre Dame (with the Duke of Alba standing in for Philip) prior to leaving France, the actual ceremony took place in Guadalajara, Spain, upon her arrival. The marriage was a result of the Peace of Cateau-Cambrésis (1559). His second wife, Mary I of England, had recently died, making Elisabeth of Valois Philip's third wife. Elisabeth's paternal aunt Margaret was also betrothed as part of the peace treaty with the duke of Savoy.

A few days after this proxy marriage, on 30 June 1559, a tournament was held by Henry II at the Hôtel des Tournelles (subsequently demolished by Catherine de Medici and replaced by the Place des Vosges during the reign of Henry IV), to celebrate the peace and his daughter Elisabeth's wedding. Tragedy would follow as, during a jousting match, King Henry was wounded in the eye by a fragment of the splintered lance of count of Montgomery, captain of the King's Scottish Guard. Despite the efforts of royal surgeons, this led to Henry's death by sepsis on 10 July 1559. Elisabeth's 15-year-old brother then became the new King of France and on 10 July 1559 he was crowned Francis II.

Because of her father's death and her brother's coronation as well as a becoming sick with "stomach flu", her departure for her new country was severely delayed. In November, the court, as well as Elisabeth's sister-in-law Mary, had gathered to bid the young princess goodbye. Elisabeth's mother Catherine was unable to attend as the King had requested that she not leave his side. At the palace of Châtellerault, when the retinue could finally begin their journey in November the speed at which they could travel was hampered by the many possessions Elisabeth was bringing, consisting of baskets and trunks filled to the brim with plates, linen, carpets, and jewelry. Added to this was a multitude of furniture and paintings as well as a retinue of 160 people. Elisabeth's gowns were so ornate that they couldn't be packed in trunks and therefore were sent by ship to Spain.

As a consequence of the large travelling party, the weather, and the resulting difficulty of the journey across the Pyrenees in winter, Elisabeth did not arrive in Spain until February 1560.

Elisabeth left France dressed as a "daughter of France" and arrived in Spain with her 16 French ladies "transformed" in the Spanish style. At her wedding she met both the painter Sofonisba Anguissola and Ana de Mendoza, who would live with her the rest of her life. Philip II appointed Anguissola to be a lady-in-waiting and court painter for his queen. Under Anguissola's tutelage, Elisabeth improved her amateur painting skills. Anguissola also influenced the artistic works of her children, Isabella Clara Eugenia and Catalina Micaela, during her time at the court.

Elisabeth brought a large entourage with her from France, including two chief ladies-in-waiting (Claude de Vineulx and Jeanne de Chassincourt), eight ladies-in-waiting (among them Louise de Clermont), four chamberwomen, kitchen staff, the surgeon Dunoir, the physician Burgensis and two apothecaries. Later the young queen's household would contain a majority of Spanish nobility ladies-in-waiting and also some Italian ladies. Elisabeth's childhood companions and relatives Anne and Suzanne de Bourbon also accompanied her.

One of her new favorites was Marta Tana, the future mother of Saint Aloysius.

Philip was completely enchanted by his 14-year-old bride and by 1564 had given up his infidelities. Despite the significant age difference, Elisabeth was also quite pleased with her husband. (In letters to her mother, she proclaimed herself to be fortunate to have married so charming a prince.) Philip enjoyed hosting chivalric tournaments to entertain his wife. Elisabeth would play liege lady to the three young princes of the Spanish Court: Carlos, Prince of Asturias; John of Austria (illegitimate son of Charles V); and Alexander Farnese, Duke of Parma (son of Charles V's illegitimate daughter Margaret). If Philip was pleased with his new wife, Elisabeth's slow adaption of the rigid Spanish court etiquette or what was expected of a Spanish queen consort was noted and her behavior such as her disorganized manner of eating (a reference to a perceived excessive consumption of meat and snacking). Both taking to her bed at the first sign of illness and her lack of interest in political matters were criticized.

Even more shocking for the Spanish court, Elisabeth allowed dancing in her private chambers. This led Elisabeth's sister-in-law Joanna of Austria to openly complain about Elisabeth's conduct to the Portuguese ambassador. Life at the Spanish court was more confining than at the French court, as demonstrated by the young queen's majordomo, the count of Alba, every night locking her inside her chambers and handing the key to Elisabeth's chief lady-in-waiting, the countess of Urena.

In 1565, Elisabeth travelled to France to meet with Catherine and her brother King Charles IX of France in a diplomatic meeting known as the Bayonne Interview. Rather than her husband, she would be accompanied by the duke of Alba, who had been entrusted by Philip with seeing the development of an anti-Protestant policy in France.

Elisabeth had originally been betrothed to Philip's son, Carlos, Prince of Asturias, but political complications unexpectedly necessitated instead a marriage to Philip. Her relationship with her troubled stepson Carlos was warm and friendly. Despite reports of his progressively bizarre behavior, Carlos was always kind and gentle to Elisabeth. When Philip eventually felt it necessary to lock Carlos away (which shortly led to the Prince's demise), Elisabeth cried for days.

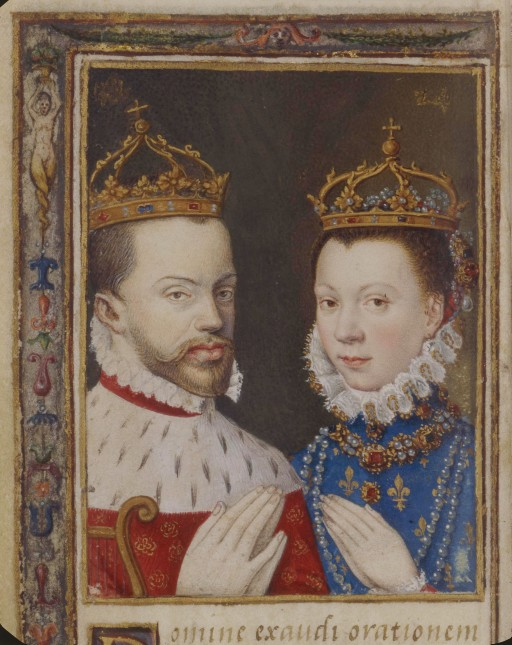
Elisabeth de Valois with her husband Philip II of Spain, from Catherine de Medici's Book of Hours

Philip was very attached to Elisabeth, staying close by her side even when she was ill with smallpox. Elisabeth's first pregnancy in 1560 resulted in a stillborn son, followed in 1564 with a miscarriage of twin girls. She later gave birth to Infanta Isabella Clara Eugenia on 12 August 1566, and then to Isabella's younger sister Catalina Micaela on 10 October 1567. Phillip and Elisabeth were very close to both of their daughters, buying them jams, dolls, toys and more. It is said "both rejoiced at the birth of Isabella as if it had been the birth of a son". Elisabeth ascribed the birth of her first daughter to a miracle attributed to Saint Eugene of Toledo, whose relics she had brought with her as a dowry to Spain.

Elisabeth corresponded with her former sister-in-law, Mary Stuart, who suggested that her infant son James be smuggled out of Scotland and brought to Spain. James would then be raised at the Spanish court and marry one of Elisabeth's daughters. But it was not meant to be: by the time Mary's letter reached Spain, Elisabeth suffered another stillbirth on 3 October 1568 and died the same day at Royal Palace of Aranjuez along with her newborn infant daughter.

After the death of Elisabeth, Catherine de' Medici offered her younger daughter Margaret as a bride for Philip. Philip declined the offer.

== In fiction ==
Coat of arms of Elisabeth of France, Queen of Spain

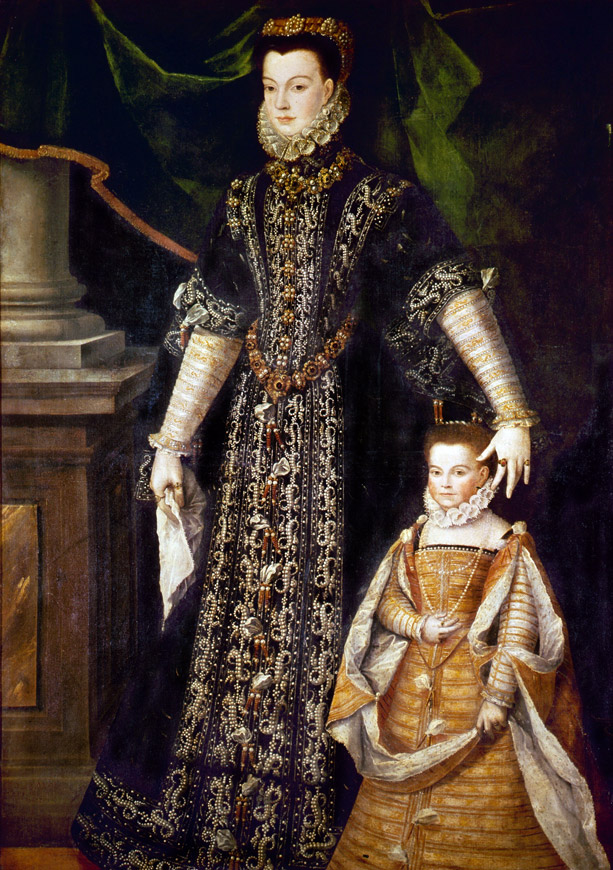
Portrait of Elisabeth of Valois and Isabella Clara Eugenia

Elisabeth of Valois is a central character in Thomas Otway's play Don Carlos, Prince of Spain; in Schiller's play of the same name; in Verdi's opera adapted from Schiller's play, also titled Don Carlos; and in several other, less well-known operas. Antonio Buzzolla's version of 1850 is actually named "Elisabetta di Valois". All these works imply a tragic romance between Elisabeth and Carlos, suggesting that they were really in love with each other when Elisabeth was forced to break off her engagement to Carlos and marry his father Philip.

In Madame de Lafayette's novella The Princesse de Cleves, Elisabeth of Valois' marriage to Philip II is the occasion for the wedding games at which her father Henri II dies; her role is brief but it substantially affects the novella's narrative arc.

Elisabeth of Valois is portrayed by Caoimhe O'Malley (in the pilot) on the CW show Reign, then later by Anastasia Phillips in the fourth season of the show.

Elisabeth is a character in tv-series "The Serpent Queen" season 2 and is portrayed as an adult by actress Laura Marcus.

Elisabeth appears in the historical novel "The Spanish Bridegroom" by British author Jean Plaidy. In the novel the young Elisabeth is torn between her love and duty to Philip and her strong relationship with her stepson, the mentally unstable Don Carlos. In private, she is appalled by the activities of the Inquisition and other rigid aspects of Spanish life, and secretly conspires with Carlos and her ladies to find ways around the harsher laws and judgements.

== Sources ==
- Anselme de Sainte-Marie, Père (1726). Histoire généalogique et chronologique de la maison royale de France [Genealogical and chronological history of the royal house of France] (in French). Vol. 1 (3rd ed.). Paris: La compagnie des libraires.
- Baumgartner, Frederic J. (1988). Henry II, King of France:1547-1559. Duke University Press.
- Carrión, María M. (2010). Subject Stages: Marriage, Theatre and the Law in Early Modern Spain. University of Toronto Press.
- Isabey, Eugène (1858). "The Departure of Elisabeth of France for Spain". The Walters Art Museum.
- Kamen, Henry (1997). Philip of Spain. Yale University Press. ISBN 9780300070811.
- Knecht, R.J. (1999). Catherine de'Medici. Longman.
- Nader, Helen, ed. (2003). Power and Gender in Renaissance Spain: Eight Women of the Mendoza Family, 1450-1650. University of Illinois Press.
- Thompson, James (1909). The Wars of Religion in France 1559-1576: The Huguenots, Catherine de Medici and Philip II. Chicago University Press.
- Tomas, Natalie R. (2003). The Medici Women: Gender and Power in Renaissance Florence. Aldershot, UK: Ashgate. ISBN 0-7546-0777-1.
- Toulalan, Sarah (2020). "Bodies, Sex, and Sexuality". In Capern, Amanda L. (ed.). The Routledge History of Women in Early Modern Europe. Routledge.
- Whale, Winifred Stephens (1914). The La Trémoille family. Boston, Houghton Mifflin. p. 43.

Elisabeth of Valois House of Valois, Angoulême branch Cadet branch of the Capetian dynasty Born: 2 April 1545 Died: 3 October 1568
Spanish royalty
Vacant Title last held by Mary Tudor of England	Queen consort of Spain; 1559–1568	Vacant Title next held by Anne of Austria
