= Margaret Yolande of Savoy =

Duchess of Parma and Piacenza from 1660 to 1663

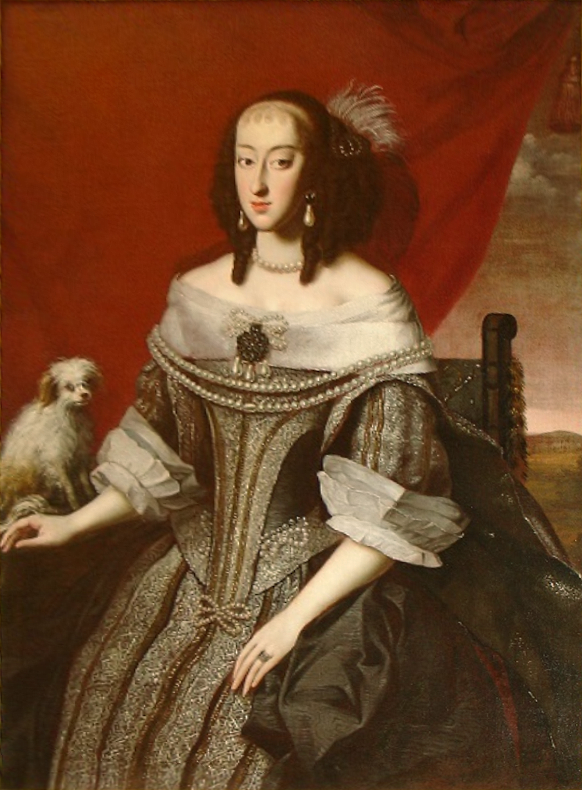
- Portrait of Margaret Yolande as the Duchess of Parma, c. 1662

Duchess consort of Parma and Piacenza
- Tenure: 29 April 1660 – 29 April 1663
- Born: 15 November 1635; Castello del Valentino, Turin, Duchy of Savoy
- Died: 29 April 1663 (aged 27); Ducal Palace of Colorno, Parma, Duchy of Parma and Piacenza
- Burial: Sanctuary of Santa Maria della Steccata
- Spouse: Ranuccio II Farnese, Duke of Parma (m. 1660)
Names
- Margherita Violante di Savoia
- House: Savoy
- Father: Victor Amadeus I, Duke of Savoy
- Mother: Christine Marie of France

Margaret Yolande of Savoy (15 November 1635 – 29 April 1663) was Princess of Savoy from birth and later Duchess consort of Parma. A proposed bride for her first cousin Louis XIV of France, she later married Ranuccio Farnese, son of the late Odoardo Farnese and Margherita de' Medici. She died in childbirth in 1663.

== Biography ==
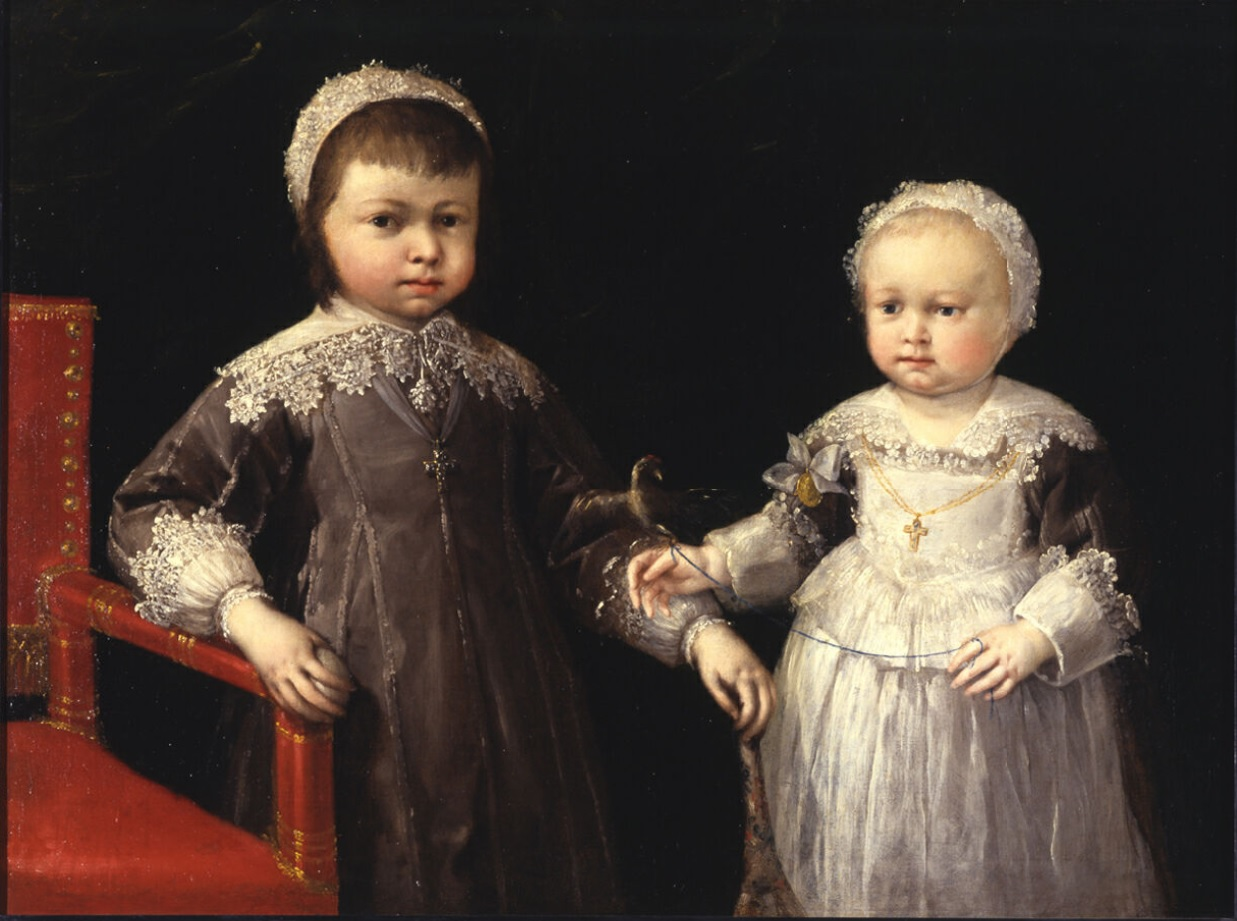
Infant Princess Margaret Yolande with her elder brother, Carlo Emanuel II, 1637, today in Galleria Sabauda (Turin), Italy

Margherita Violante was the fifth child born to Victor Amadeus I, Duke of Savoy and his wife Christine Marie of France, daughter of Henry IV of France and Marie de' Medici. She was born at the Castello del Valentino in the Duchy of Savoy which had been ruled by her family since 1416. Her father died in October 1637, when she was just two years old. As such, her oldest surviving brother Prince Francis Hyacinth succeeded as Duke of Savoy. Her mother was thus Regent of Savoy.

Margherita Violante grew up at a time when her two uncles Prince Maurice and his younger brother Prince Thomas of Savoy disputed the power of their sister-in-law, and her French entourage.

The first of her siblings to marry was her eldest sister Princess Luisa Cristina who married their uncle Maurice of Savoy in 1642. Her younger sister, Henriette Adelaide of Savoy married in 1650 to Ferdinand Maria, Elector of Bavaria. Margherita Violante's mother the French born Christine Marie started communicating with France in order to secure a marriage between Margherita Violante and the young Louis XIV, first cousin of Margherita Violante; Louis XIV's father Louis XIII was the oldest brother of Christine Marie.

Margherita Violante was in competition with the Spanish court who had presented the Infanta Maria Teresa of Austria as another proposed bride. Maria Teresa was a daughter of Elisabeth of France, another sister of Louis XIII and Christine. Maria Teresa's father Philip IV of Spain was also the brother of Anne of Austria, mother of Louis XIV and was eager to bring about peace between France and Spain with the marriage of Louis and Maria Teresa.

Negotiations with France and Savoy went as far as Louis XIV and Margherita Violante, known to the French as Marguerite Yolande de Savoie, meeting at Lyon on the French royal family leaving Paris on October 26, 1658. The French entourage included the Dowager Queen, Louis XIV, Philippe d'Anjou, la Grande Mademoiselle and Marie Mancini.

The French were impressed by her appearance despite saying her skin was too tanned. They also said she was a quiet girl. Upon hearing of this meeting at Lyon, Philip IV is said to have said the marriage would not happen..

Prior to the proposed Franco-Savoyard match, Antoine Pimentel marquis de Tábara, Spanish ambassador had had secret talks with Cardinal Mazarin which later led the French to say to the Savoyard's ...the Savoyard marriage is not for the King of France, Philip IV King of Spain proposes his daughter, the Infanta Maria Teresa who has all the qualities of being the wife of Louis XIV...

The match, great for Savoy, was never to be; Louis XIV married Maria Teresa, the two were the parents of le Grand Dauphin. Margherita Violante herself would remain unmarried until 1660. Her chosen husband would be the reigning Duke of Parma Ranuccio Farnese. The two would marry in Turin on 29 April 1660. The couple had two children who both died; the first was a stillborn daughter; the second was a son who lived only one day.

Margherita Violante and her husband started to reconstruct the Ducal Palace of Colorno, the main residence of the Ducal family. It was at the Ducal Palace that she died giving birth to her second child. She was buried at the Sanctuary of Santa Maria della Steccata in the centre of Parma.

After her death, her husband married two princesses of Modena Isabella d'Este (1635–1666) and then her sister Maria d'Este. The only surviving child of Isabella was Odoardo Farnese, father of the future Elisabeth Farnese, Queen of Spain. The son born to Maria Francesco Farnese, later Duke of Parma, continued the work at Colorno dying in 1727.

== Issue ==
- NN Farnese [stillborn daughter] (Ducal Palace of Colorno, 14 December 1661)
- NN Farnese [son] (Ducal Palace of Colorno, 27 April 1663 – Ducal Palace of Colorno, 28 April 1663)

== Ancestors ==
Ancestors of Margaret Yolande of Savoy

8. Emmanuel Philibert, Duke of Savoy
4. Charles Emmanuel I, Duke of Savoy
9. Margaret, Duchess of Berry
2. Victor Amadeus I, Duke of Savoy
10. Philip II of Spain
5. Catherine Michelle of Austria
11. Elisabeth of Valois
1. Margaret Yolande of Savoy
12. Anthony of Navarre
6. Henry IV of France
13. Joan III of Navarre
3. Christine of France
14. Francesco I de' Medici, Grand Duke of Tuscany
7. Marie de' Medici
15. Joanna of Austria
