= Piedmontese Civil War =

Civil war in the Savoyard state

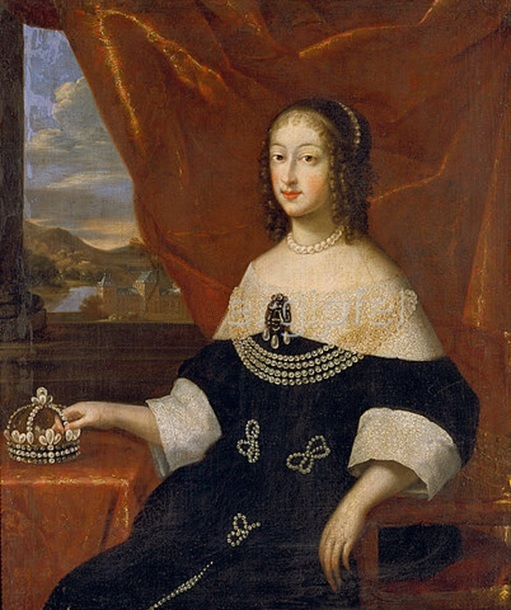
- Christine of France, Regent and head of the Madamisti faction
Date	1639 – 1642
Location	Savoyard state, particularly Piedmont
Result	1642 treaties of Turin

Belligerents
(Duchy of Savoy) Madamisti faction France	(Duchy of Savoy) Principisti faction Spain

Commanders and leaders
(Kingdom of France) Comte d'Harcourt (Kingdom of France) Vicomte Turenne (Duchy of Savoy) Christine Marie (Kingdom of France) La Mothe-Houdancourt	Prince Thomas (Spain) Marquis of Leganés (Duchy of Savoy) Prince Maurice

Strength
12,000 – 15,000	16,000 – 20,000

The Piedmontese Civil War (Note: Also known as the Savoyard Civil War), 1639 to 1642, was a succession struggle for control of the Savoyard state. Although Savoy was not directly involved in the 1635 to 1659 Franco-Spanish War, its strategic importance prompted the intervention of Spain and France.

Following the death of Victor Amadeus I, Duke of Savoy in October 1637, his wife Christine of France ruled on behalf of heir young son, Francis Hyacinth. When he, too, died in 1638, she became guardian to her second son, Charles Emmanuel II. In 1639, her regime (Note: The Madamisti, or "Madam" faction) was challenged by Prince Maurice of Savoy and Thomas Francis, Prince of Carignano. (Note: The Principisti, or 'Princes' faction)

After four years of fighting, Christine was confirmed as Regent, a position she retained until her death in 1663. As part of the settlement that ended the war, Prince Maurice married his niece Princess Luisa Cristina of Savoy, and became governor of the Savoyard territory of Nice; Prince Thomas was given control of the fortresses of Biella and Ivrea, and thereafter fought for the French.

== Background ==
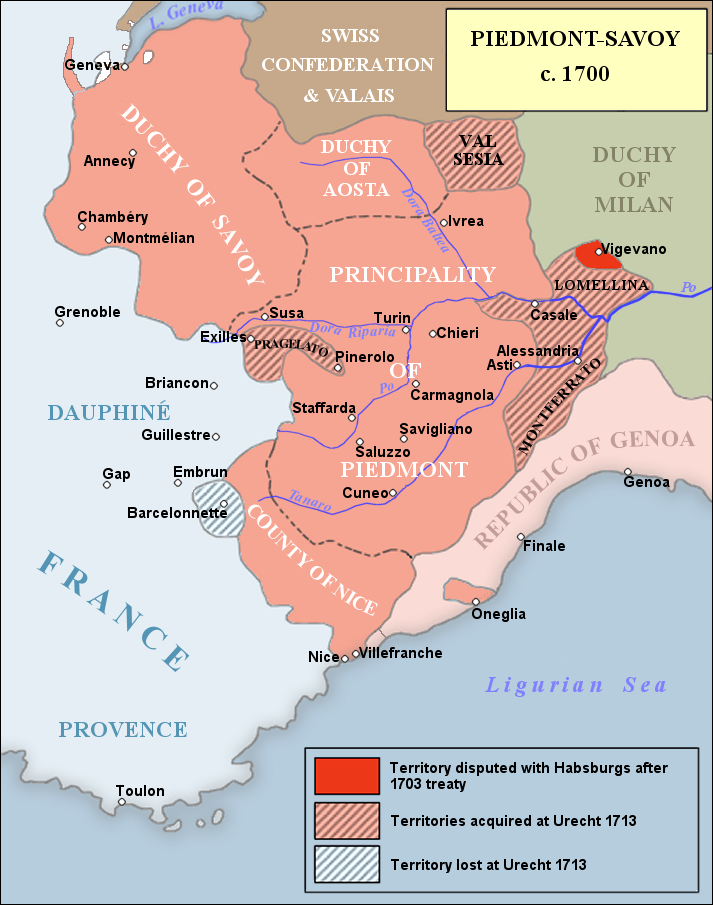
Savoyard state, circa 1700; note the County of Nice and Duchy of Savoy, today part of France

Northern Italy had been contested by France and the Habsburgs for centuries. Often referred to as 'Savoy', the Savoyard state was split into two main geographic segments; Piedmont, which contained the capital Turin, and the Duchy of Aosta, on the Italian side of the Alps, with the Duchy of Savoy and County of Nice in Transalpine France. French control of Piedmont prevented foreign powers from gaining access to the restive southern provinces of the Dauphiné and Vaunage, former Huguenot strongholds with a long history of rebellion. It also allowed them to threaten the Spanish-held Duchy of Milan, part of the Spanish Road, an overland route connecting the Spanish Netherlands to Habsburg possessions in Italy, a primary source of recruits for the Army of Flanders.

Although Spain was then the most powerful state in Europe, its reliance on long exterior lines of communication was a potential weakness. Cardinal Richelieu sought to weaken Spain by attacking it wherever possible, which led to French involvement in the 1628 to 1631 War of the Mantuan Succession. That ended with their candidate, Charles I Gonzaga, confirmed as ruler of the Duchy of Mantua, and French garrisons were installed in the Savoyard fortresses of Pinerolo and Casale. Their possession protected the Alpine passes into southern France and allowed France to threaten Milan at will.

Since these positions were also vital to the security of Savoy, it was a way of controlling Victor Amadeus I, Duke of Savoy, whose wife Christine Marie of France was sister to Louis XIII. Like many rulers, Victor Amadeus tried to balance both sides; his younger brother, Thomas Francis, Prince of Carignano, was a military leader of considerable ability, who commanded Spanish troops against France at Les Avins in May 1635. The other, Prince Maurice of Savoy was a Catholic Cardinal; the former French representative at the Roman Curia switched allegiances to the Holy Roman Empire in 1636.

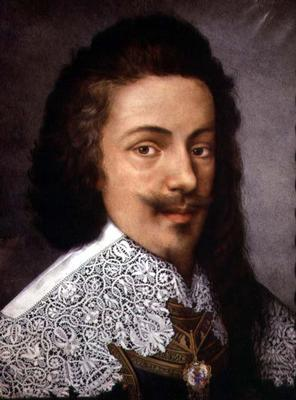
Victor Amadeus I, Duke of Savoy, whose death in October 1637 precipitated the war

After the outbreak of the Franco-Spanish War in 1635, Richelieu supported Savoyard-led operations against Milan in order to tie down Spanish resources. These included an unsuccessful attack on Valenza in 1635, plus minor victories at Tornavento and Mombaldone (see Map). In June 1637, Leganés, Spanish governor of Milan, captured the Savoyard town of Vercelli; the anti-Habsburg alliance in Northern Italy fell apart when Charles of Mantua died in September, followed by Victor Amadeus in October.

As his heir, Francis Hyacinth, was only five years old, Charles's will appointed Christine as regent. Despite her French connections, she attempted to preserve Savoyard independence, although her options were restricted by the presence of French troops and a chronic lack of money. Her two brothers-in-law suspected that France intended to annex Savoy, a concern that had some basis in reality since control of the duchy was part of Richelieu's anti-Habsburg policy.

In October 1638, Francis died, and was succeeded by his four-year-old brother, Charles Emmanuel. Although Christine continued as regent, that was not covered by Victor Amadeus's will. Maurice and Thomas argued her position had to be approved by the Savoy Estates or by the Holy Roman Emperor, who was technically the overlord of the duchy.

The Princes, or 'Principisti', had considerable support among ordinary Piedmontese, who resented the French presence; those who backed Christine, known as 'Madamisti', included a number of powerful families, notably the d'Aglié clan. However, that simplifies an extremely complex reality; the 'Principisti' were equally concerned by Spanish intentions towards Savoy, and some of them supported Maurice, rather than Thomas, and there were many individual links between the factions.

At the end of 1638, Thomas went to Madrid to negotiate for Spanish support; he was not entirely trusted since his wife, Marie de Bourbon, was a member of the French royal family. As a result, she and their children lived in Madrid as hostages for his good behaviour. In March 1639, Richelieu ordered his commanders to arrest Thomas if he entered Savoy, and Louis wrote to Christine to demand that she bar both Thomas and Maurice from Piedmontese territory.

== Phase I: 1639 to 1640 ==
Piedmont; key locations 1635-1642

Under the terms of their alliance, the Princes kept any towns that opened their gates without resistance, the Spanish those taken by force. The deal was not nearly as attractive as it seemed, since the most important were held by the French, who could be expected to resist, and potentially meant exchanging French domination for Spanish. In March 1639, Thomas entered Piedmont, quickly occupying Chieri, Moncalieri, Ivrea, Verrua and Chivasso, but the main prize was Turin, held by a French garrison. Whoever held it controlled Piedmont, making it imperative to negotiate a deal; he secretly opened negotiations with Christine, while Richelieu allegedly offered him offices and a pension if he switched sides.

In June, Christine ceded Cherasco and Carmagnola to France, in return for an annual subsidy of one million Écus; she also agreed to 'discuss' the future of Savoyard possessions, including the County of Nice. The Princes issued a joint declaration denouncing this as a betrayal, but blaming it on 'ambitious courtiers' such as the d'Aglié family. Maurice occupied Nice, while Thomas entered Turin in July with an army of 12,000, helped by supporters inside the city.

Along with Charles Emmanuel, Christine escaped to the Citadel, which was held by a well-supplied French garrison; built by Francesco Paciotto between 1564 and 1577, it was generally reputed to be impregnable. After a failed attempt to recover the city, Christine concluded a truce with Thomas until 24 October, while they continued negotiations. During this delay, Richelieu dispatched one of his best commanders, the Comte d'Harcourt, to take command of French troops in Pinerolo.

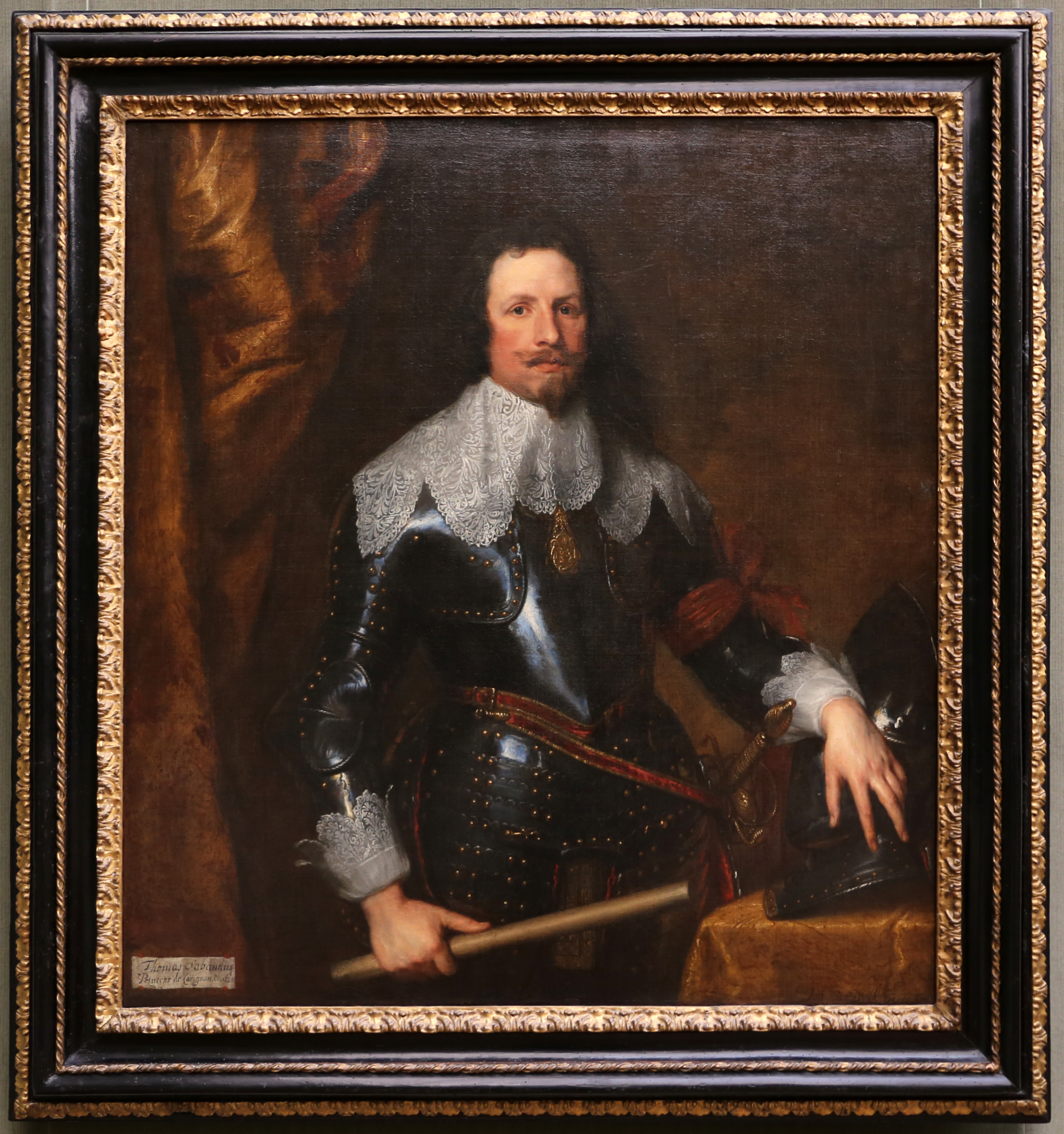
Thomas Francis, Prince of Carignano, military leader of the Principisti faction

When the truce expired, Harcourt attacked Chieri, successfully distracting attention from a resupply convoy sent to his garrison at Casale in what is known as the Battle of the Route de Quiers. However, Leganés advanced on Chieri from the south, and Thomas marched out of Turin; threatened from two sides, Harcourt withdrew towards Pinerolo on 20 November, only to find his road blocked by the Spanish. Despite being outnumbered, Thomas and Leganés failed to coordinate their attacks, allowing Harcourt to defeat them separately, in an action known as La Rotta. Covered by a rearguard led by Turenne, the French reassembled at Carignano, before returning to Pinerolo (see Map).

While Thomas resumed his blockade of Turin's citadel, Leganés besieged Casale; in April 1640, Harcourt marched to relieve the town with 10,000 men. Dividing his army into three parts under himself, Turenne and La Mothe-Houdancourt, he attacked the Spanish lines on 29 April. After several hours of hard fighting, Leganés withdrew, allegedly suffering more than 3,000 casualties, many drowned when a bridge collapsed.

Harcourt now entered Turin, beginning one of the most complex and famous military events of the 17th century. A small French garrison in the citadel was blockaded by 12,000 troops under Thomas; he was now besieged by Harcourt; at the end of May, he was in turn surrounded by a relief force of 18,000 under Leganés. After their defeat at Casale, the Spanish would not risk attacking the French and were unable to keep Thomas supplied. Convinced Leganés was deliberately seeking to undermine him, he agreed terms with Harcourt and on 24 September withdrew from Turin to his base at Ivrea.

== Phase II: 1641 to 1642 ==
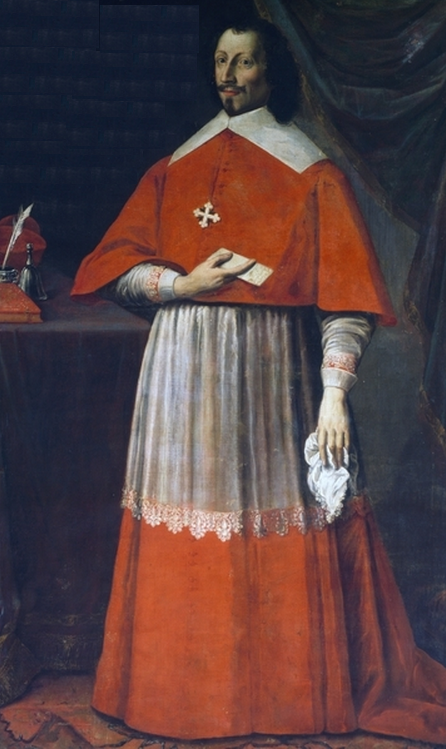
Prince Maurice of Savoy, wearing his cardinal robes

Over the winter, Thomas held talks with Richelieu, hoping to secure Savoy's independence and end the damage being caused to Piedmont. Leganés had been replaced as Habsburg commander by Cardinal Trivulzio, who tried to support Thomas as best he could, but in 1640, protests against tax increases erupted into open revolts in Portugal and Catalonia. Desperately short of troops and money, the Spanish effectively ceased operations in Northern Italy.

This reality led to an acceleration of negotiations between the Princes, Richelieu and Christine; despite the weakness of her position, Christine insisted on her position as head of state, as well as compensating Thomas and Maurice. Richelieu's fury at her refusal to concede these points was reflected in his private correspondence, in which he described her as 'obstinate', dominated by her ministers, and 'weak.' These judgements influenced later perceptions of Christine, especially by French historians.

When Thomas' brother-in-law, the Comte de Soissons, was killed at La Marfée in July 1641, it left his sister Marie as heir and gave Richelieu a powerful bargaining tool. Two treaties were finally signed at Turin in June 1642, the first between France and the Princes, who agreed to enter French service and restore the lands they had occupied to Christine. In return, Thomas received a pension, his wife's inheritance, and help in securing the release of his family from Spain; Maurice was granted the governorship of Nice and renounced his position as cardinal to marry his niece, Princess Luisa Cristina of Savoy.

The second treaty, between Christine and her brothers-in-law, restated the stipulations of the first, while Thomas was also given control of Biella and Ivrea for the duration of the regency. Both sides agreed to release their prisoners without ransom, confirmed officeholders already in place, while Christine agreed to ensure Thomas and Maurice were included in state decision-making.

== Aftermath ==
Although the civil war had ended, the final settlement was seen as benefiting France, which retained garrisons in Turin, Pinerolo and Casale, while neutralising any opposition to French control. Richelieu, who died in December 1642, tried to incentivise Thomas to continue the war against Spain by agreeing that Savoy could keep any territory conquered from Milan. With Spain on the defensive in Northern Italy, this seemed an opportunity, but Thomas was also handicapped by a lack of resources.

An alternative view sees it as a triumph for Christine, who had prevented the annexation of Savoy by France, Richelieu's original intention. She also managed to reconcile with her brothers-in-law, while retaining control of government, even after Charles Emmanuel reached adulthood in 1648. The same year, Thomas went into exile in Paris, where he died in 1656. Maurice lived in relative obscurity until his death in 1657; Christine was still the main power in Savoy when she too died in 1663.

== Sources ==
- Burckhardt, Carl Jacob (1971). Richelieu and his age, Vol 3. George Allen & Unwin.
- Cuerva, Ruben Gonzalez; Koller, Alexander (2017). A Europe of Courts, a Europe of Factions: 12 Rulers & Elites. Brill. ISBN 978-9004350571.
- De Périni, Hardÿ (1896). Batailles Françaises, Volume III (in French). Ernest Flammarion, Paris.
- Duffy, Christopher (1995). Siege Warfare: The Fortress in the Early Modern World 1494-1660. Routledge. ISBN 978-0415146494.
- Dumont, Jean (1728). Corps universel diplomatique du droit des gens: contenant un recueil des traitez d'alliance, de paix ... faits en Europe depuis le regne de Charlemagne jusques à present; Volume VI, Part 1 (in French). Amsterdam. pp. 253–254.
- Ferretti, Giuliano (2014). "La politique italienne de la France et le duché de Savoie au temps de Richelieu". Dix-septième siècle (in French). 1 (262): 7. doi:10.3917/dss.141.0007.
- Guth, Paul (1999). Mazarin (in French). Flammarion. ISBN 978-2080679222.
- Hanlon, Gregory (2016). The Twilight Of A Military Tradition: Italian Aristocrats And European Conflicts, 1560-1800. Routledge. ISBN 978-1138158276.
- Spallone, Roberta (2017). "The 'Regular Fortress' by Guarini and the Citadel of Turin". Nexus Network. 19 (2): 255–277. doi:10.1007/s00004-016-0327-3.
- Wilson, Peter (2009). Europe's Tragedy: A History of the Thirty Years War. Allen Lane. ISBN 978-0713995923.
