= Princess Luisa Cristina of Savoy =

- Princess of Oneglia; Marchioness of Argentera and Bersezio
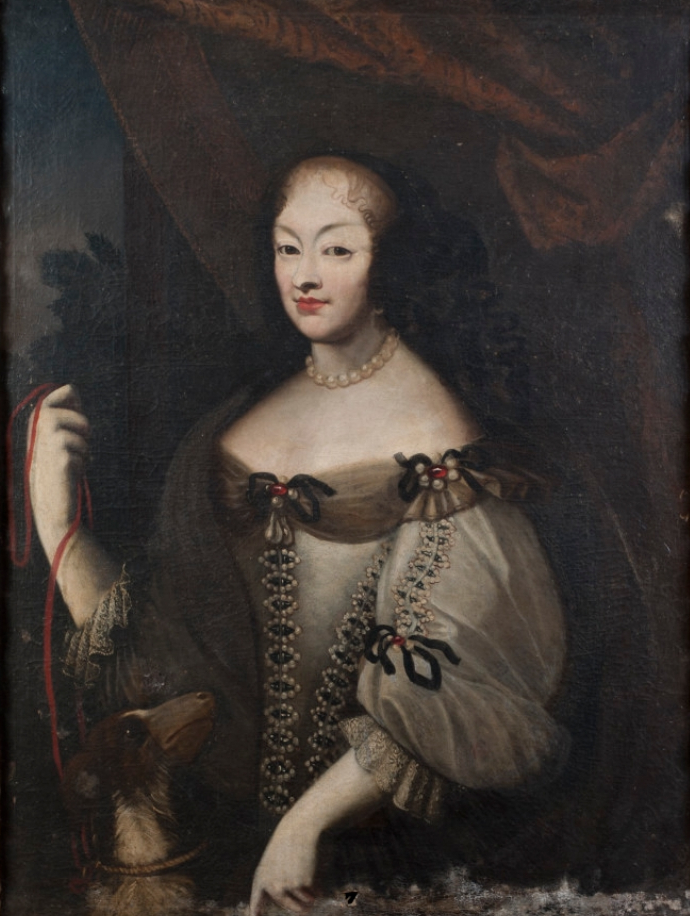
- Born: 27 July 1629; Castello del Valentino, Turin
- Died: 12 May 1692 (aged 62); Vigno di Madama, Turin
- Spouse: Prince Maurice of Savoy (m. 1642; died 1657)
- House: Savoy
- Father: Victor Amadeus I, Duke of Savoy
- Mother: Christine of France

Princess Luisa Cristina of Savoy (27 July 1629 – 12 May 1692) was a Princess of Savoy by birth and the eldest daughter of Victor Amadeus I, Duke of Savoy. She married her uncle Prince Maurice of Savoy but had no children. She was the owner of the future Villa della Regina. She was a first cousin of kings Louis XIV of France and Charles II of England.

== Biography ==
Luisa Cristina was born at the Castello del Valentino in Turin. She was the eldest daughter of the future Victor Amadeus I, Duke of Savoy and his wife Christine Marie of France. Her birth was greeted with excitement as prior to her birth, her parents had lost a son and heir and were expecting another son. However, being a female and due to the Salic law, she was barred from succeeding to the Duchy of Savoy which at the time of her birth was ruled by her grandfather Charles Emmanuel I. Luisa Cristina was said to have been illegitimate and the fruit of her mother's supposed affair with a French courtier named "Pommeuse".

As a child, two of Luisa Cristina's brothers succeeded their father, who became ruler of Savoy in 1630. Her father died in 1637 and was succeeded quickly by her brother Francis Hyacinth who died in 1638 and was followed to the throne by another brother Charles Emmanuel II. Her mother, Christine Marie, took over as regent, a development which was disputed by Luisa Cristina's uncles Thomas Francis, Prince of Carignano and Cardinal Maurice. The two brothers conspired against Christine Marie as regent, claiming the regency between the two of them. This led to a civil war in Savoy.

The war resulted in Thomas Francis and Maurice fleeing to Spain in the vain hope of finding support. Luisa Cristina's mother was soon victorious in the ensuing wars thanks to French support in the form of her brother, Louis XIII. Returning to Savoy, Luisa Cristina was soon engaged to Maurice as part of a reconciliation between Christine Marie. Luisa Cristina married Maurice in Turin on 18 August 1642. Maurice had previously been a cardinal and had to receive permission from Pope Urban VIII who consented to the match. The thirteen-year-old bride and forty-nine-year-old Maurice moved to Nice where Maurice was the governor of the city – another part of the reconciliation.

Her husband died in 1657 of a stroke leaving Luisa Cristina a widow aged twenty seven. Her husband willed her his large art collection as well as his huge debts. In Turin she lived at her husband's villa outside Turin. She also did much to improve the structure under the direction of Amedeo di Castellamonte. She also commissioned Guarino Guarini to carry out works on churches in Savoy. Luisa Cristina died at the villa and left the property to her nephew's consort, the French born Anne Marie d'Orléans.

== Ancestry ==
Ancestors of Princess Luisa Cristina of Savoy

8. Emmanuel Philibert, Duke of Savoy
4. Charles Emmanuel I, Duke of Savoy
9. Margaret, Duchess of Berry
2. Victor Amadeus I, Duke of Savoy
10. Philip II of Spain
5. Catherine Michelle of Austria
11. Elisabeth of Valois
1. Luisa Cristina of Savoy
12. Anthony of Navarre
6. Henry IV of France
13. Joan III of Navarre
3. Christine of France
14. Francesco I de' Medici, Grand Duke of Tuscany
7. Marie de' Medici
15. Joanna of Austria
