= Henriette Adelaide of Savoy =

Electress of Bavaria from 1651 to 1676

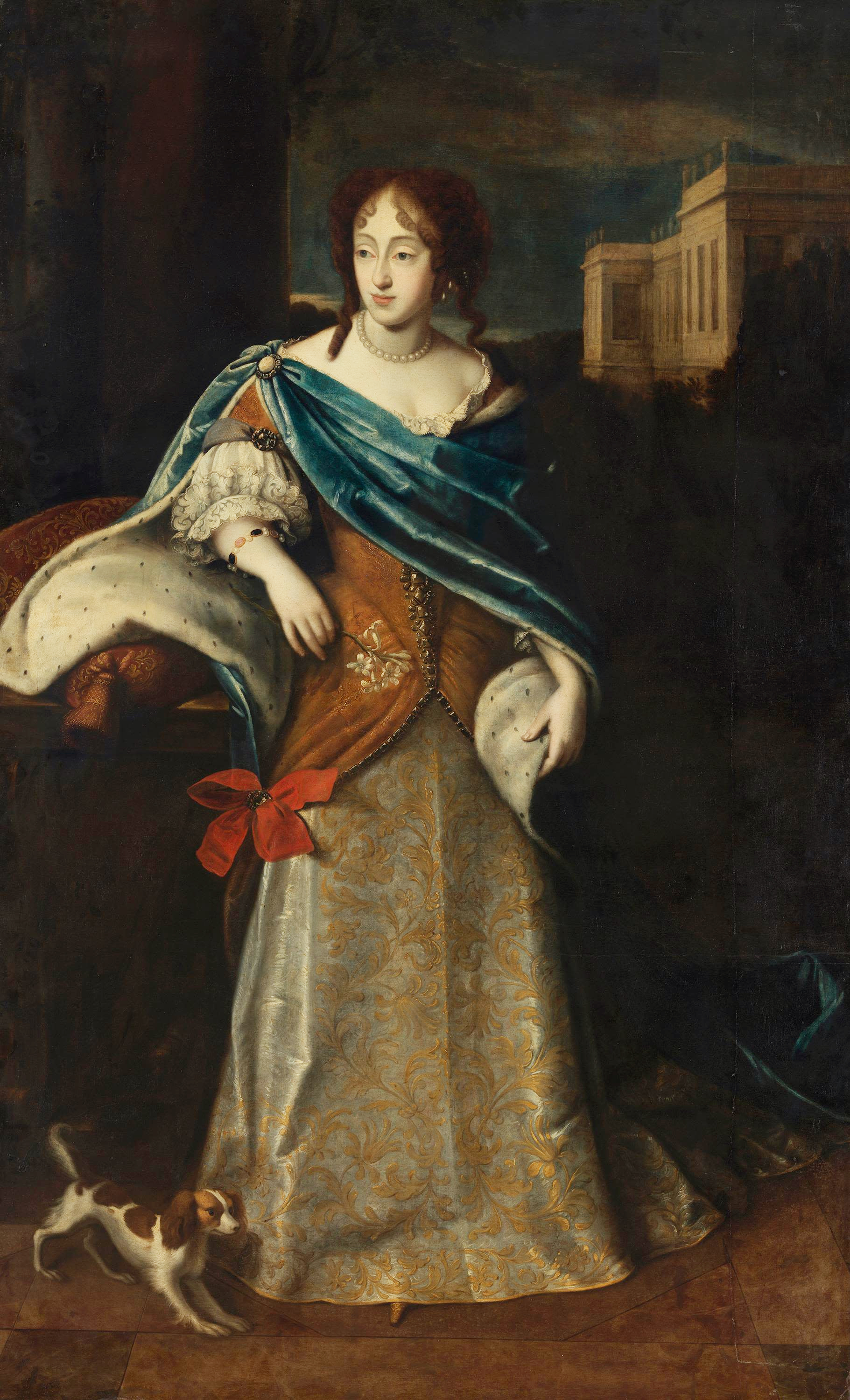

Electress consort of Bavaria
- Tenure: 27 September 1651 – 13 June 1676
- Born: 6 November 1636; Castello del Valentino, Turin, Savoy
- Died: 13 June 1676 (aged 39); Nymphenburg Palace, Munich
- Spouse: Ferdinand Maria, Elector of Bavaria (m. 1650)
- Issue Detail: Maria Anna Victoria, Dauphine of France; Maximilian II Emanuel, Elector of Bavaria; Joseph Clemens, Elector-Archbishop of Cologne; Violante Beatrice, Grand Princess of Tuscany
Names
- Enrichetta Adelaide Maria; Henriette Adelaide Marie
- House: Savoy
- Father: Victor Amadeus I, Duke of Savoy
- Mother: Christine Marie of France

Henriette Adelaide of Savoy (Henrietta Adelaide Maria; 6 November 1636 – 13 June 1676) was Electress of Bavaria by marriage to Ferdinand Maria, Elector of Bavaria. She wielded considerable political influence in her adopted country and with her husband did much to improve the welfare of the Electorate of Bavaria.

== Early life ==
Born at the Castello del Valentino in Turin, Henriette was the older of twin girls; her sister Catherine Beatrice of Savoy died in Turin 26 August 1637. On 7 October 1637 her father, Victor Amadeus I, Duke of Savoy, died when she was just one year old. Her mother, Christine of France, was the daughter of Henry IV of France and Marie de' Medici. After the death of her father, her mother served as Regent of Savoy on behalf of two of Henriette Adelaide's brothers: Francis Hyacinth from 1637 to 1638 and then Charles Emmanuel II until 1648.

== Electress of Bavaria ==
On 8 December 1650 Henriette married Ferdinand Maria, the heir to the Electorate of Bavaria. The following year, Ferdinand Maria became Elector following the death of his father, Maximilian I. Henriette Adelaide had a strong influence on Bavarian foreign affairs in favor of France, whose royal family counted her mother as a member. This led to an alliance between France and Bavaria against Austria. One of the results of the alliance was the marriage of Henriette's eldest daughter Maria Anna and her cousin Louis, Grand Dauphin, in 1680.

Henriette had a leading role in the building of Nymphenburg Palace and the Theatine Church in Munich. Many Italian artists were invited to Munich, and she also introduced Italian opera to the court of Bavaria.

Henriette died in Munich and was buried in the Theatine Church – the church she and her husband built as a gesture of thanks for the birth of the long-awaited heir to the Bavarian crown, Maximilian II Emanuel, in 1662.

== Issue ==
- Maria Anna Victoria of Bavaria (28 November 1660 – 20 April 1690) married Louis, Dauphin of France, and had issue; the present King of Spain descends from her.
- Maximilian II Emanuel, Elector of Bavaria (11 July 1662 – 26 February 1726); married Maria Antonia of Austria and had issue; married Theresa Kunegunda Sobieska and had issue.
- Luise Margarete Antonie of Bavaria (18 September 1663 – 10 November 1665).
- Ludwig Amadeus Victor of Bavaria (6 April 1665 – 11 December 1665).
- Stillborn son (4 August 1666).
- Kajetan Maria Franz of Bavaria (2 May 1670 – 7 December 1670).
- Joseph Clemens of Bavaria (5 December 1671 – 12 November 1723) Elector and Archbishop of Cologne.
- Violante Beatrice of Bavaria (23 January 1673 – 30 May 1731) married Ferdinando de' Medici, Grand Prince of Tuscany.

In addition, the Electress suffered three miscarriages: in June 1661, March 1664 and 1674.

== Sources ==
- Preuß: Henriette Adelheid, Kurfürstin von Baiern [In:] Allgemeine Deutsche Biographie (ADB). vol. 50, Duncker & Humblot, Leipzig 1905, pp. 198–200.
- Roswitha von Bary: Henriette Adelaide. Kurfürstin von Bayern. Pustet, Regensburg 2004, ISBN 3-7917-1873-8.
- Cornelia Kemp: Das Herzkabinett der Kurfürstin Henriette Adelaide in der Münchner Residenz. Eine preziöse Liebeskonzeption und ihre Ikonographie [In:] Münchner Jahrbuch der bildenden Kunst 33, 1982, ISSN 0077-1899, pp. 131–154.
- Reinhold Baumstark: Abbild und Überhöhung in der höfischen Malerei unter Henriette Adelaide und dem jungen Max Emanuel [In:] Hubert Glaser: Kurfürst Max Emanuel. Bayern und Europa um 1700. vol. I: Zur Geschichte und Kunstgeschichte der Max-Emanuel-Zeit. Hirmer, Munich 1976, ISBN 3-7774-2790-X, pp. 171–205.
- Else Strobl (1953). "Adelheid (Henriette Maria Adelaide)". Neue Deutsche Biographie (in German). Vol. 1. Berlin: Duncker & Humblot. pp. 58–59. (full text online).

Royal titles
Preceded by Archduchess Maria Anna of Austria	Electress consort of Bavaria; 27 September 1651 – 13 June 1676	Succeeded by Archduchess Maria Antonia of Austria
