= Taverna (disambiguation) =

A taverna is a place serving Greek cuisine.

Taverna may also refer to:

- Taverna (surname), an Italian surname

== Places ==
- Taverna, Calabria, a small town in the Province of Catanzaro, Italy
- Palazzo Taverna (disambiguation)

== Software ==
- taveRNA, a software suite for nucleic acids
- Apache Taverna, an open source workflow management system

== See also ==
- Tavern, an establishment serving food and alcoholic beverages
- Trevena (disambiguation)
