= Trasviña =

Trasviña is a surname. Notable people with the surname include:

- John D. Trasviña (born 1958), American human rights attorney
- Lucía Trasviña Waldenrath, Mexican politician

== See also ==
- Trevena (disambiguation)
