= Taverna (surname) =

Taverna is a surname. Notable people with the surname include:

- Alessandro Taverna (born 1983), Italian pianist.
- Ferdinando Taverna (1558–1619), Italian cardinal
- Gaudenz Taverna (1814-1878), Swiss portrait painter and graphic artist
- Henri Taverna, French film editor
- Juan Taverna (1948–2014), Argentine former footballer
- Ludovico Taverna (1535–1617), Italian diplomat and bishop of Lodi
- Paola Taverna (born 1969), Italian politician
- Rinaldo Taverna (1839–1913), Italian politician and general
- Santiago Rodríguez Taverna (born 1999), Argentine professional tennis player

== See also ==
- Taverna (disambiguation)
