= Duchy of Savoy =

Duchy in Western Europe (1416–1860)

Duchy of Savoy: Ducatus Sabaudiae (Latin); Ducât de Savouè (Arpitan); Ducà 'd Savòja (Piedmontese); Ducato di Savoia (Italian); Duché de Savoie (French)
- 1416–1792; 1814–1847
- Flag Coat of arms
- Motto: FERT (Motto for the House of Savoy)
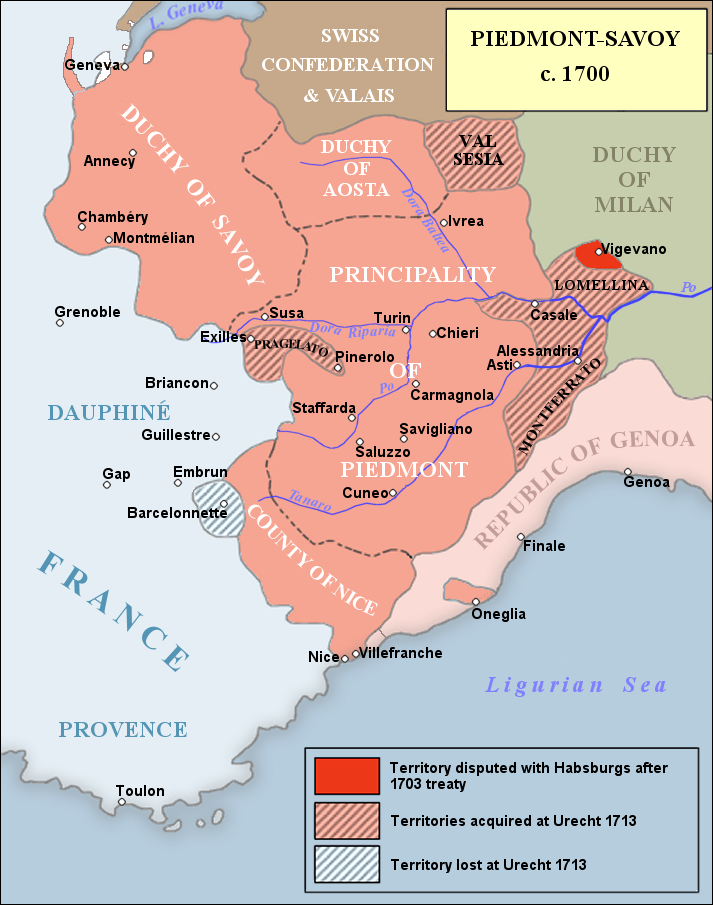
- States of the Duke of Savoy around 1700; Savoy proper is in the northwest.
- Status: De jure Imperial State of the Holy Roman Empire (until 1792); Core country of the Savoyard state
- Capital: Chambéry (1416–1562); Turin (1562–1792, 1814–1847)
- Common languages: Latin; (official until the 15th century); French; (official from the 15th century); Italian; (official from 16th century); Francoprovençal; (spoken)
- Religion: Roman Catholicism
- Demonym: Savoyard
- Government: Monarchy
- Duke
  - 1416–1440: Amadeus VIII
  - 1831–1847: Charles Albert
- Historical era: Modern Era
  - County of Savoy raised to duchy: 1416
  - Occupied by France: 1536–59, 1630, 1690–96, 1703–13
  - Acquired Sicily and parts of Duchy of Milan: 11 April 1713
  - Acquired Kingdom of Sardinia in exchange for Sicily: 1720
  - Annexed by Revolutionary France: 1792–1814
  - Perfect Fusion: 1847
Preceded by
County of Savoy
Duchy of Montferrat
Holy Roman Empire
Succeeded by
First French Republic
Kingdom of Sardinia
- Today part of: Italy; France; Switzerland

The Duchy of Savoy (Arpitan: Ducât de Savouè; Piedmontese: Ducà 'd Savòja; Italian: Ducato di Savoia) was a territorial entity of the Savoyard state that existed from 1416 until 1847 and was a possession of the House of Savoy. It was created when Sigismund, Holy Roman Emperor, raised the County of Savoy into a duchy for Amadeus VIII. The duchy was an Imperial fief, subject of the Holy Roman Empire, until 1792, with a vote in the Imperial Diet. From the 16th century, Savoy belonged to the Upper Rhenish Circle.

Its territory included the current French departments of Savoie, Haute-Savoie, and the Alpes-Maritimes, Aosta Valley and most of Piedmont in Italy, and the Prince-Bishopric of Geneva in Switzerland, which eventually broke away and achieved independence as the Republic of Geneva. The main Vulgar languages that were spoken within the Duchy of Savoy were Franco-Provençal and Piedmontese.

== Terminology ==
The Duchy of Savoy was the central and most prominent of the territories possessed by the House of Savoy, and hence this title was and still is used often to indicate the whole of their possessions. In reality, the Savoys ruled not a unitary state, but a complex array of different entities and titles with different institutional, cultural, and legal backgrounds. These included for example the Duchy of Aosta, Principality of Piedmont, and County of Nice, which were distinct and not juridically part of the Duchy of Savoy. The Savoys themselves referred to their possessions as a whole as "the States of the Duke of Savoy" (Italian: "gli Stati del Duca di Savoia"). Today, historians use the term Savoyard state to indicate this entity, which is an example of composite monarchy where many different and distinct territories are united in a personal union by having the same ruler.

== History ==
=== 15th century ===
The duchy was created in 1416 when Sigismund, Holy Roman Emperor (r. 1433–1437) awarded the title of "Duke" to Count Amadeus VIII.

Being landlocked at its conception in 1388, the County of Savoy acquired a few kilometres of coastline around Nice. Other than this expansion, the 14th century was generally a time of stagnation. Pressure from neighbouring powers, particularly France, prevented development, which characterized the rest of the Renaissance era for Savoy.

The reign of Amadeus VIII was a turning point for the economy and the policy of the state, which deeply marked the history of the nation. His long reign was highlighted by wars (the country expanded its territory by defeating the Duchy of Montferrat and Marquisate of Saluzzo), as well as reforms, edicts and some controversial actions. The first was in 1434, when he chose to withdraw to the Château de Ripaille, where, living the life of a hermit, he founded the Order of St. Maurice. In 1439, he received an appointment as antipope, which he accepted (under the name of Felix V), although he subsequently resigned a decade later out of a fear of undermining the religious unity of Christians.

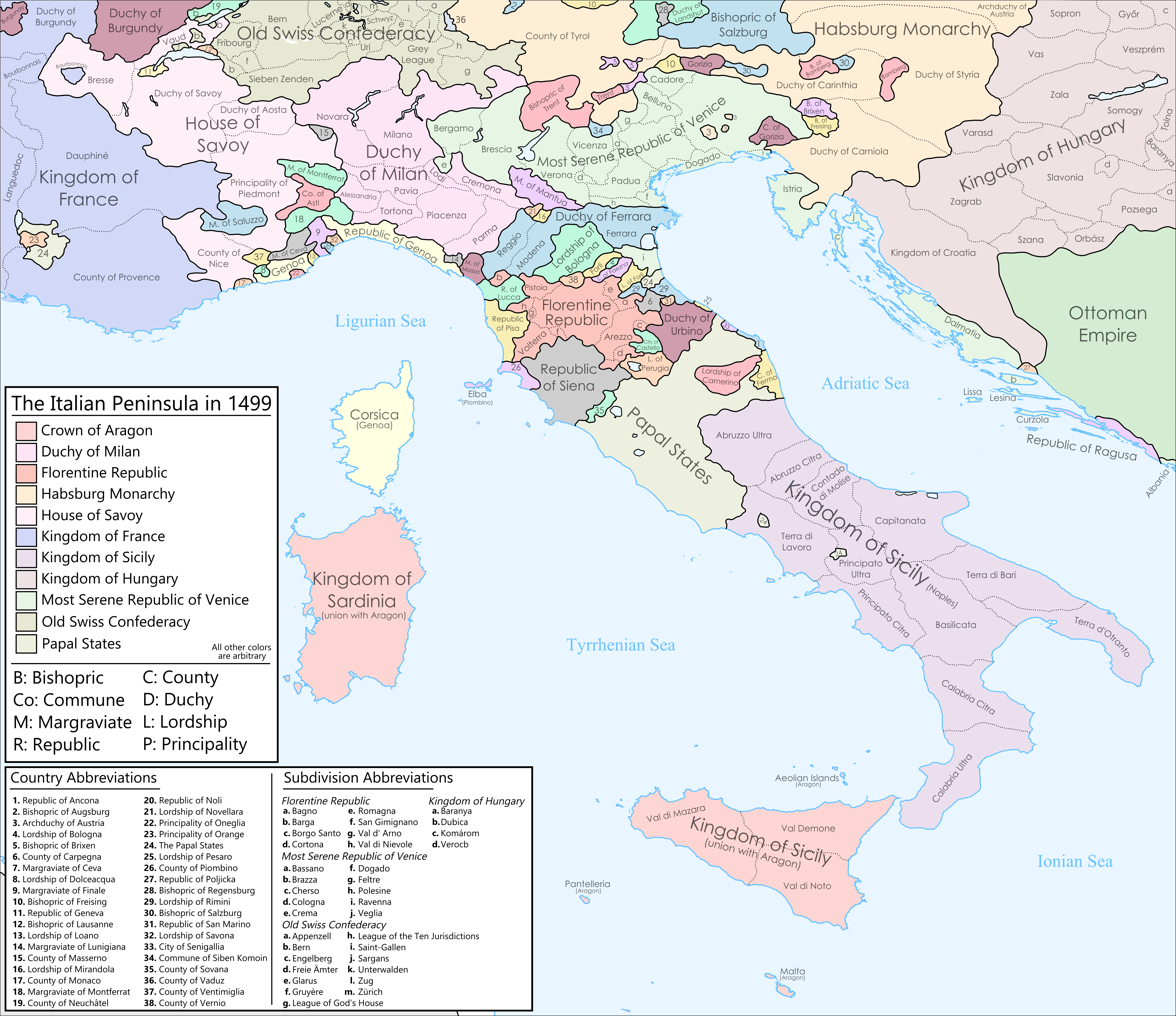
The Italian Peninsula in 1499.

The second important action of the Government of Amadeus VIII was the creation of the Principality of Piedmont in August 1424, the management of which was entrusted to the firstborn of the family as a title of honor. The duke left the territory largely formed from the old Savoy domain.

As a cultured and refined man, Duke Amadeus gave great importance to art. Among others, he worked with the famous Giacomo Jaquerio in literature and architecture, encouraging the cultivation of the arts in the Italian Piedmont.

However, his first son Amedeo died prematurely in 1431 and was succeeded by his second son Louis. Louis was in turn succeeded by the weak Amadeus IX, who was extremely religious (he was eventually declared blessed), but of little practical power, to the point that he allowed his wife, Yolande (Violante) of Valois, sister of Louis XI, to make very important decisions. During this period, France was more or less free to control the affairs of Savoy, which bound Savoy to the crown in Paris.

The Duchy's economy suffered during these years, not only because of war, but also because of the poor administration by Violante. The future of the nation was entrusted to the hands of a boy, Philibert I, who died at the early age of seventeen, after reigning for ten years. He was succeeded by Charles I, who died aged 21, and Charles II, who died aged 6. As a consequence of its participation in the Burgundian Wars, Savoy lost all its possessions north and south-east of Lake Geneva to the Swiss.

=== 16th century ===
When Philibert II died in 1504, he was succeeded by Charles III the Good, and Savoy entered into a period of weak leadership. Later in 1515 as a part of the War of the League of Cambrai, the French defeated the Swiss and Milanese at the Battle of Marignano, occupied Milan, and put all of northern Italy including Saluzzo, Genoa and Savoy under its influence. King Francis I of France, however, was not satisfied and began to bide his time, just waiting for an opportunity to permanently annex Savoy and its possessions. Ultimately in 1536, Francis ordered the occupation of the duchy, which was invaded by a strong military contingent. Charles III realized too late the weakness of the state, and tried to defend the city of Turin. However, the city was lost on 3 April of the same year. Charles III retreated to Vercelli, trying to continue the fight, but never saw the state free from occupation.

Emmanuel Philibert was the duke who more than any other influenced the future policy of Savoy, managing to put an end to the more than twenty-year long occupation. The Peace of Cateau-Cambrésis, signed in 1559, restored full autonomy to the duchy, with his marriage to Margaret of France.

Emmanuel Philibert realized that Savoy could no longer trust France. He therefore moved the capital from Chambéry to Turin in 1562, which he protected with a complex system of fortifications known as the Cittadella (remnants of the Cittadella can still be seen, although it was largely destroyed by the subsequent expansion of the city). From his military experience in Flanders, Emmanuel Philibert learned how to run an army, having won the famous Battle of St. Quentin (1557). He was the first duke of Savoy to establish a stable military apparatus that was not composed of mercenaries but rather by specially trained Savoyard soldiers.

His son, Charles Emmanuel I, extended the duchy to the detriment of the lordships of Montferrat and the territory of Saluzzo, previously ceded to France, in 1601 under the Treaty of Lyon. The wars of Charles Emmanuel ended mostly in defeats. Nevertheless, he is remembered as "Charles the Great", since he was a versatile and cultured man, a poet and a skillful reformer. He was able to manage the duchy at a time of severe crisis vis-a-vis the European powers and found support from the Habsburgs. The policy of Charles Emmanuel was in fact based more on actions of international warfare, such as the possessions of the Marquis of Saluzzo, and the wars of succession in the duchies of Mantua and Montferrat. Generally, Savoy sided with Spain, but on occasion allied with France (as, for example, the Treaty of Susa required).

=== 17th century ===
During the seventeenth century, the influence of the court of Versailles put pressure on Savoy. Due to the proximity of the Spanish controlled Duchy of Milan and Savoyard defeats in the previous century, French troops were garrisoned in forts (such as Pinerolo) in a number of key Alpine passes on the Italian side. This severely threatened the independence of the duchy.

During the Thirty Years' War, Savoy was one of the states of the Holy Roman Empire that largely sided with France and against both the Emperor and Spain. Savoyard troops participated on the side of the French in the Savoyard-Genoese War, the War of the Montferrat Succession, the Tornavento campaign and, in part, in the Piedmontese Civil War, among other places.

The strong French influence, plus various misfortunes, repeatedly hit Savoy following the death of Charles Emmanuel I (26 July 1630). First of all, the plague ran rampant in 1630 and contributed significantly to the already widespread poverty.

The War of the Mantuan Succession (1628–1631) was very bloody in the countryside and subjected Casale Monferrato to a long siege (1629). Developments of arms and politics affected the economy and future history, exacerbating the already difficult situation after the death of Victor Amadeus I in 1637. He was succeeded for a short period of time by his eldest surviving son, the 5-year-old Francis Hyacinth. The post of regent for the next-oldest son, Charles Emmanuel II, also went to his mother Christine of France, whose followers became known as madamisti (supporters of Madama Reale). Because of this, Savoy became a satellite state of the regent's brother, King Louis XIII of France. The supporters of Cardinal Prince Maurice of Savoy and Thomas Francis, Prince of Carignano (both sons of Charles Emmanuel I), together with their followers, took the name of principisti (supporters of the Princes).

Each warring faction soon besieged the city of Turin. The principisti made early gains, severely looting Turin on 27 July 1639. Only in 1642 did the two factions reach an agreement; by now, the widow of Victor Amadeus I had placed Victor's son Charles Emmanuel II on the throne and ruled as regent in his place, even past his age of majority.

A resurgence of religious wars took place during the regency. Subsequently, in 1655, Savoyard troops massacred large numbers of the Protestant population of the Waldensian valleys, an event known as the Piedmontese Easter (Pasque Piedmont). Reports from the massacres spread quickly throughout Protestant Europe, sparking outrage, especially in Britain. Lord Protector Oliver Cromwell threatened the Duchy of Savoy with intervention, somewhat shaping the military decisions made by the Duke. On 18 August 1655, the Pinerolo Declaration of Mercy was issued, which constituted a peace treaty between Charles Emmanuel II and the Waldensians.

The government of Charles Emmanuel II was the first step towards major reforms carried out by his successor Victor Amadeus II in the next century. Of particular importance were the founding of militias in Savoy and the establishment of the first public school-system in 1661. A cultured man, but also a great statesman, Charles Emmanuel imitated King Louis XIV of France at the sumptuous Palace of Venaria, a masterpiece of Baroque architecture, and a copy recreated in Italy of the magnificence of the Palace of Versailles. It was a time of great urban expansion, and Charles Emmanuel II promoted the growth of Turin and its reconstruction in the baroque style. After his death in 1675, there followed the period of the regency (1675–1684) of his widow, the new Madama Reale, Marie Jeanne Baptiste of Savoy-Nemours.

=== From duchy to kingdom ===
Charles Emmanuel II was succeeded by his 11-year-old son, Victor Amadeus II; his mother, the French born Marie Jeanne Baptiste of Savoy-Nemours was regent. Marie Jeanne sought to marry her son to the daughter and heir presumptive of King Peter II of Portugal. This could have led to the House of Savoy becoming rulers of Portugal.

After Victor Amadeus II assumed power, Savoy became hostile to France, which invaded in the Nine Years' War. Savoy defeated the French in the siege of Cuneo, but was dramatically defeated in the battles of Staffarda and Marsaglia. Savoy became a French satellite, and Victor Amadeus II married Anne Marie d'Orléans, niece of King Louis XIV.

Italian Peninsula in 1796.

Savoy remained a French ally during the first phase of the War of the Spanish Succession, but changed sides later. France invaded again, and Savoy was saved by Austrian troops led by the Duke's cousin, Prince Eugene of Savoy at the siege of Turin.

At the end of the war in 1713, Victor Amadeus II received the Kingdom of Sicily. By the Treaty of London, Victor Amadeus II reluctantly exchanged Sicily for Sardinia in 1720. The various dominions held in personal union by Victor Amadeus II included Sardinia, Savoy, Piedmont, Aosta, Nice, and Oneglia. The collection was usually referred to as "Sardinia", meaning the kingdom.

Charles Emmanuel III, son and successor of Victor Amadeus II, joined the War of the Austrian Succession and concluded it with a resounding victory against the French in the Battle of Assietta. In the subsequent Treaty of Aix-la-Chapelle (1748) he gained parts of western Lombardy like Angera and Vigevano.

After the French Revolution, Savoy was invaded by the French Revolutionary Army in 1792 and annexed to France. Savoy was first incorporated as the department of Mont-Blanc; then, in 1798, it was divided between the departments of Mont-Blanc and Léman. Part of Savoy was restored to Victor Emmanuel I in 1814 by the Congress of Vienna in 1814, with the remainder being returned in 1815 after the Hundred Days.

Under the 1847 Perfect Fusion, the duchy was merged with the other parts of the Savoyard state into the unitary Kingdom of Sardinia. Savoy itself would be given to France under the terms of the Treaty of Turin (1860).

== Army ==
The duchy was a notable regional military power, often getting involved in wars between the French and Habsburgs. In the 17th century, peacetime strength tended to hover around 4,800 professional soldiers (3,600 infantry and 1,200 cavalry), with a large peasant militia. In times of war, militiamen were trained and impressed and mercenaries were hired, and the size of the army quickly rose. In 1625, the duchy had an army of 26,600 regulars (25,381 infantry and 1,213 cavalry), plus about 8,000 militia. The regulars consisted of 5 to 7 regiments of Piedmontese, with mercenaries comprising the rest, including 9 regiments of French and 2 regiments of Italians. In 1635 the regular army was down to 12,250, then 15,710 in 1637, 18,000 in 1649, then 5,500 in the peacetime year of 1660, then 26,178 in 1672, and 35,000 in 1705 (with 10,000 militia called up to bolster them and more uncalled).

The militia was relatively well-armed and consisted of 24,000 men in 1566, of whom about a third could be used outside of their immediate district.

== List of dukes of Savoy ==
- Amadeus VIII: 1391–1440, duke from 1416
- Louis: 1440–65
- Amadeus IX: 1465–72
- Philibert I: 1472–82
- Charles I: 1482–90, first titular King of Cyprus, Jerusalem and Armenia of the House of Savoy
- Charles (II) John Amadeus: 1490–96
- Philip II: 1496–97
- Philibert II: 1497–1504
- Charles III: 1504–53
- Emmanuel Philibert: 1553–80
- Charles Emmanuel I: 1580–1630
- Victor Amadeus I: 1630–37
- Francis Hyacinth: 1637–38
- Charles Emmanuel II: 1638–75
- Victor Amadeus II: 1675–1730, King of Sicily 1713–1720, then King of Sardinia^{1}
- Charles Emmanuel III: 1730–1773
- Victor Amadeus III: 1773–1792
- French occupancy: 1792–1814 (department of Mont-Blanc)
- Victor Emmanuel I: 1814–1821
- Charles Felix: 1821–1831
- Charles Albert: 1831–1849
- Victor Emmanuel II: 1849–1861 (last)

== Flag ==
The flag of Savoy was a white cross on a red field. It is based on a crusader flag, and as such is identical in origin to the flag of the Knights of Malta (whence the modern Flag of Malta and of the Sovereign Military Order of Malta), and others (flags of Denmark and Switzerland, with inverted colors to those of England and Genoa, among others). In the 18th century, the letters "FERT" were sometimes added in the cantons to distinguish the flag from the Maltese one.

== See also ==
- Savoy's annexation to France (1792)
- History of Savoy from 1860 to 1914
- Château des ducs de Savoie
- L'Hôpital (Savoie)

== Notes ==
1. When the Duchy of Savoy acquired Sicily in 1713 and later Sardinia in 1720, the title of "Duke of Savoy", while remaining a primary title, became a lesser title to the title of King. The Duchy of Savoy remained as a state of the new country until the Perfect Fusion of King Charles Albert, at which point the kingdom became a unitary state.

== Sources ==
- Hearder, Harry (2002). Morris, Jonathan (ed.). Italy: A Short History. Cambridge University Press. ISBN 978-0521000727.
- Longhi, Andrea (2015). "Palaces and Palatine Chapels in 15th-Century Italian Dukedoms: Ideas and Experiences". In Beltramo, Silvia; Cantatore, Flavia; Folin, Marco (eds.). A Renaissance Architecture of Power: Princely Palaces in the Italian Quattrocento. Brill. ISBN 978-9004315501.
- Oresko, Robert (1997). "The House of Savoy in search for a royal crown in the seventeenth century". In Oresko, Robert; Gibbs, G. C.; Scott, H. M. (eds.). Royal and Republican Sovereignty in Early Modern Europe: Essays in Memory of Ragnhild Hatton. Cambridge University Press. ISBN 978-0521419109.
- Wiel, Alethea (1898). The Romance of the House of Savoy 1003-1519. In two volumes. New York: G. P. Putnam's.
