= Palazzo Taverna =

Palazzo Taverna may refer to:

- Palazzo Taverna, Milan, Italy
- Palazzo Taverna, Rome, Italy
