= Palazzo Taverna, Rome =

Palace in Rome, Italy

Palazzo Taverna
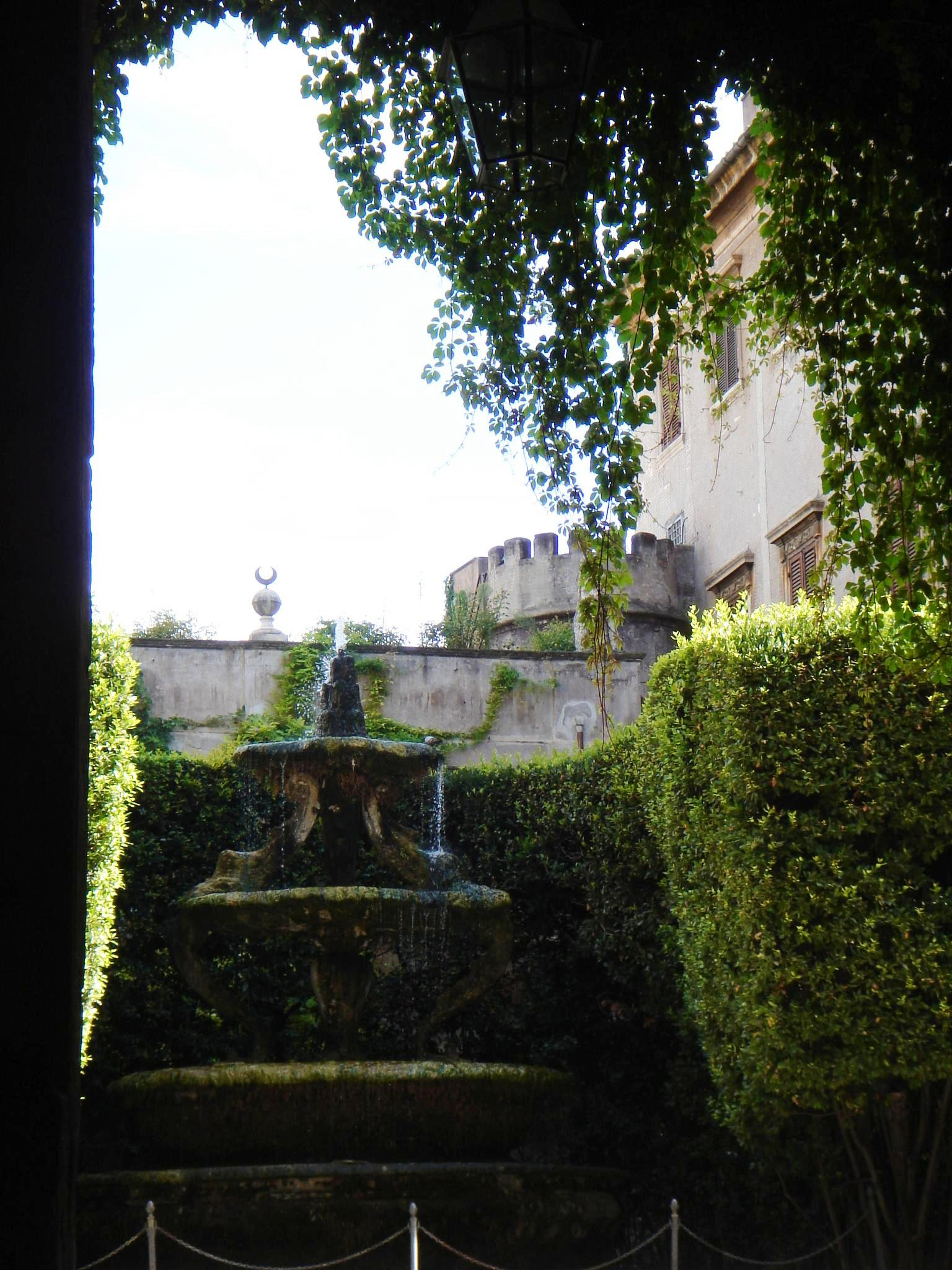
- The main fountain of the Palazzo
- Interactive map of the Palazzo Taverna area

General information
- Location: Rome, Italy

Palazzo Taverna is a palace in Rome, located on the Via di Monte Giordano and first built under orders of Cardinal Giordano Orsini, who wished to turn his ancient castle on the Monte Giordano into a residence. It was the residence of Adriana when she was overseeing the education of the children of the man who would be elected Pope Alexander VI: Lucrezia Borgia, Juan Borgia and Cesare Borgia. It was later rented by notable figures such as cardinals Ippolito II d'Este (Lucrezia Borgia's son), who used it to host Torquato Tasso, and Maurizio di Savoia.

It passed to the Gabrielli family in 1688 and they used it to host members of the Bonaparte family such as Eugénie de Montijo. In 1888 it passed to the Taverna family.

The palace was the seat of the French Embassy to the Holy See until 1951, until it was moved to the Villa Paolina by decision of Ambassador Wladimir d'Ormesson.

The palace consists of several very large halls, a courtyard replete with four marble basins with a fountain in the center as well as a garden with a tower. The main fountain in the gardens was designed by Antonio Casoni. The interior, completely frescoed, includes a large collection of paintings by various artists, including Sebastiano Ricci, Giambattista Pittoni and Rosa di Tivoli.
