= Christine of France =

Duchess of Savoy from 1630 to 1637

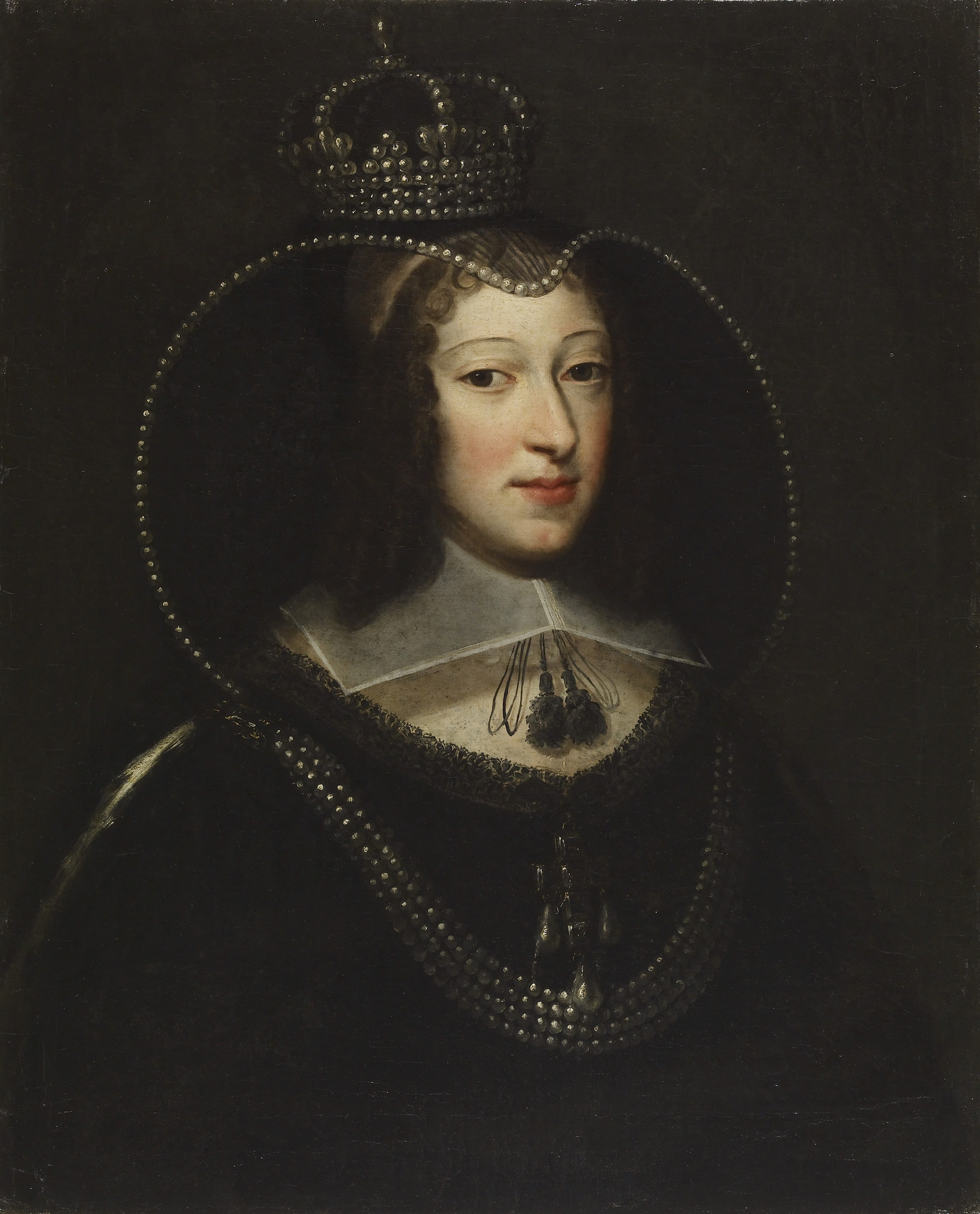
- Christine in mourning as regent of Savoy, c. 1640

Duchess consort of Savoy
- Tenure: 26 July 1630 – 7 October 1637
- Born: 10 February 1606; Palais du Louvre, Paris, France
- Died: 27 December 1663 (aged 57); Palazzo Madama, Turin, Savoy
- Burial: Basilica of Sant'Andrea
- Spouse: Victor Amadeus I, Duke of Savoy (m. 1619; died 1637)
- Issue Detail: Princess Luisa Cristina; Francis Hyacinth, Duke of Savoy; Charles Emmanuel II, Duke of Savoy; Margaret Yolande, Duchess of Parma; Henrietta Adelaide, Electress of Bavaria; Princess Catherine Beatrice
Names
- Christine Marie de France
- House: Bourbon
- Father: Henry IV of France
- Mother: Marie de' Medici

Christine of France (Christine Marie; 10 February 1606 – 27 December 1663) was Duchess of Savoy from 26 July 1630 to 7 October 1637 as the consort of Duke Victor Amadeus I. She was the daughter of Henry IV of France and sister of Louis XIII. Following her husband's death in 1637, she acted as regent of Savoy between 1637 and 1648.

== Daughter of France ==
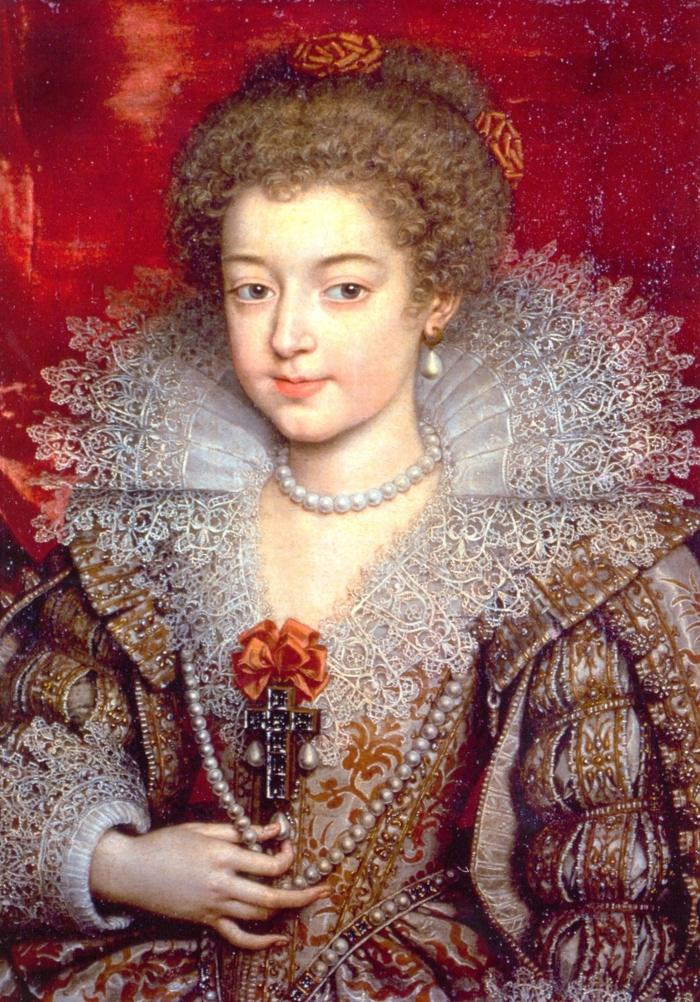
Christine as a child, by Frans Pourbus the Younger.

Born in the Palais du Louvre in Paris, Christine was the third child and second daughter of King Henry IV of France and his second wife Marie de' Medici. As a daughter of the king, she was a Daughter of France. She was a younger sister of Louis XIII and Elisabeth of France and an older sister of Nicholas Henri, Duke of Orléans, Gaston, Duke of Orléans and Henrietta Maria of France. Christine was a sister-in-law of Philip IV of Spain through Elisabeth and of Charles I of England through Henrietta Maria. As a child, she was raised under the supervision of the royal governess Françoise de Montglat.

After the marriage of her older sister Elisabeth in 1615 to the future Philip IV of Spain, Christine took on the honorary title of Madame Royale, which indicated her status as the eldest and most senior unmarried daughter at the court of her brother. After her marriage, the style went to her younger sister Henrietta Maria.

== Princess of Piedmont ==
Christine married Victor Amadeus I, Duke of Savoy, on 10 February 1619 at the Louvre in Paris. From 1619 till her husband's accession, she was known as the Princess of Piedmont. He was a son of Charles Emmanuel I, Duke of Savoy, and the Infanta Catherine Michelle of Spain. She was said to be volatile and frivolous. Educated at the French court, she introduced French culture to the court of Savoy. Her residences included the Palazzo Madama, which she had rebuilt, and she was also the driving force for the reconstruction of the Castello del Valentino as well as the additions to the Royal Palace of Turin. She would also later own Villa Abegg, the old residence of her brother-in-law Maurice of Savoy.

She did as much as she could to ensure that her court rivalled in splendour that of her sister Henrietta Maria, wife of Charles I of England. In spite of this, the two sisters maintained an avid correspondence throughout their life which showed their close relationship. She was a confidant to the exiled Queen Henrietta, who often wrote to her about her experiences during the English Civil War and her son's restoration. Christine encouraged her husband to claim his right to the rather empty title of King of Cyprus and Jerusalem, a 'kingdom' which led to him being tagged as 'a king without a crown'. She did not keep it a secret that she would rather have been a queen than a duchess, or that she also wanted to transform the minor Duchy of Savoy into a little France.

== Duchess and Regent of Savoy ==
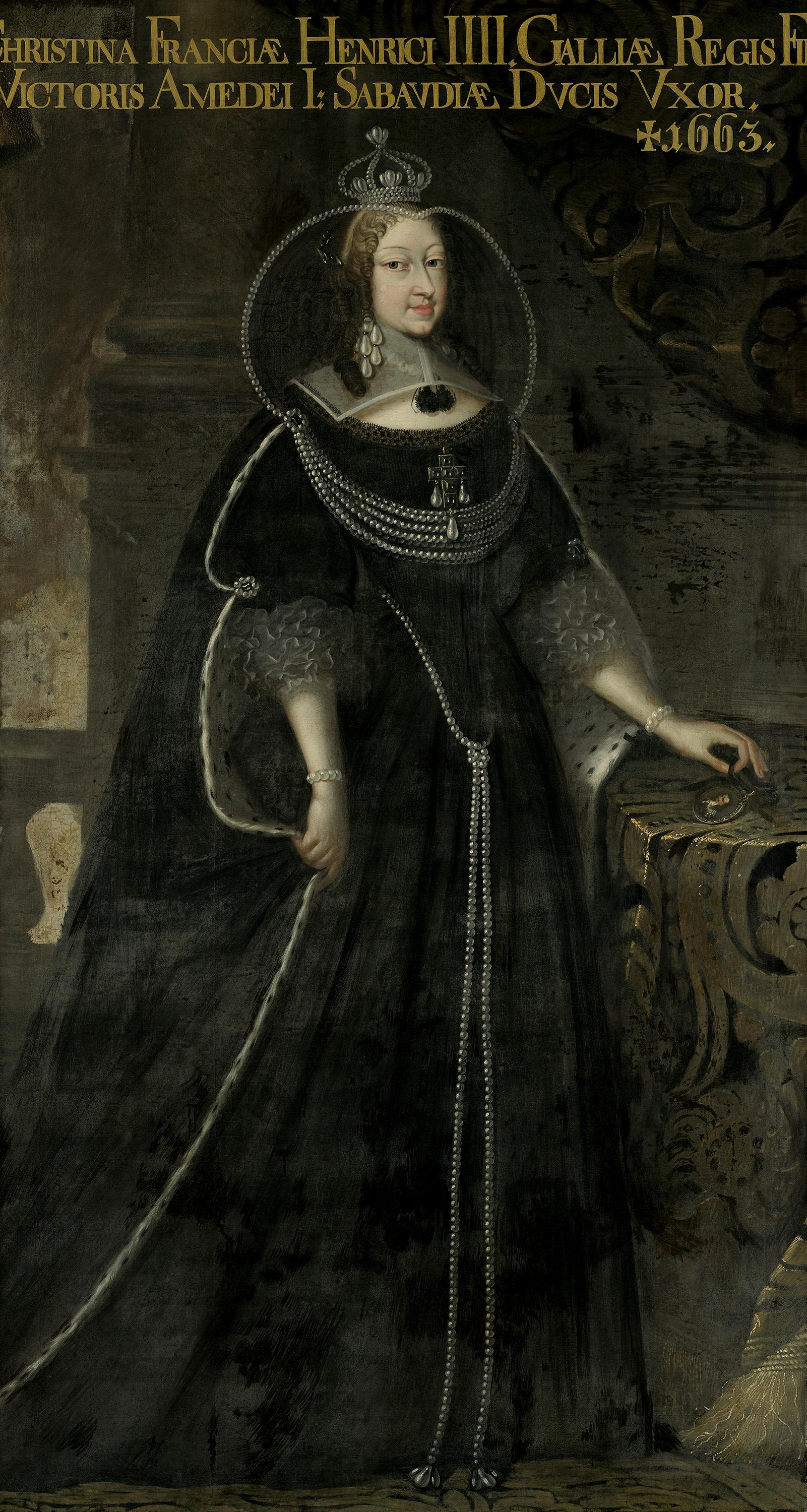
Portrait of Christine in mourning as Regent of Savoy

Victor Amadeus became Duke after the death of his father on 26 July 1630. When Christine's husband died in 1637, she was created regent in the name of her son Francis Hyacinth. At the death of Francis Hyacinth in 1638, her second son Charles Emmanuel II succeeded and Christine retained the regency.

Both Prince Maurice and his younger brother Prince Thomas of Savoy disputed the power of their sister-in-law and her French entourage. When the first heir Francis Hyacinth died in 1638, both brothers started the Piedmontese Civil War with Spanish support. The two parties were called "principisti" (supporters of the Princes) and "madamisti" (supporters of Madama Reale).

After four years of fighting, Christine was victorious, thanks to French military support. Not only did she keep the Duchy for her son, she also prevented France getting too much power in the Duchy. When peace was concluded in 1642, Maurice married his fourteen-year-old niece Louise Christine, abandoning the title of cardinal and asking dispensation from Pope Paul V. Maurice became governor of Nice. Christine of France stayed in firm control of the Duchy of Savoy until her son could follow in her footsteps; her formal regency ended in 1648, but she remained in charge at his invitation until her death.

She lived an uninhibited private life and had relationships with the French Ambassador, Marini, her brother-in-law, Maurice, and Count Filippo d'Aglié.

== Later life ==
She encouraged her son Charles Emmanuel to marry her niece Françoise Madeleine d'Orléans, the youngest surviving daughter of Gaston, Duke of Orléans, her youngest brother. They married 3 April 1663.

Christine died at the Palazzo Madama, Turin, on 27 December 1663 at the age of 57 and was buried at the Basilica of Sant'Andrea. She had outlived four of her seven children.

== Aftermath and legacy ==
Françoise Madeleine died in January 1664 and her son later married another cousin, Marie Jeanne of Savoy. Marie Jeanne would give birth to Victor Amadeus II of Sardinia who would later marry another French Princess (and member of the House of Orléans) Anne Marie d'Orléans. 17 years after her death, in 1680, her granddaughter Marie Anne Christine Victoire of Bavaria via her third daughter Princess Henriette Adelaide of Savoy, would marry her older brother's grandson Louis de France known as 'the Fat' and Monseigneur. Christine thus became a direct ancestress of the Spanish branch of the House of Bourbon via Victoria's second son Philip V of Spain.

In 2010, it was revealed on NBC's Who Do You Think You Are? that one of her descendants is model/actress Brooke Shields. Princess Michael of Kent, born Baroness Marie Christine, is also a descendant by Christine's son, Charles Emmanuel.

== Issue ==
1. Stillborn son (1621)
2. Prince Louis Amadeus of Savoy (1622–1628)
3. Princess Luisa Christina of Savoy (27 July 1629 – 14 May 1692) married Prince Maurice of Savoy with no issue.
4. Francis Hyacinth, Duke of Savoy (14 September 1632 – 4 October 1638), Duke of Savoy
5. Charles Emmanuel II, Duke of Savoy (20 June 1634 – 12 June 1675) married Françoise Madeleine d'Orléans and had no issue; secondly married Marie Jeanne of Savoy and had issue.
6. Princess Margaret Yolande of Savoy (15 November 1635 – 29 April 1663) married Ranuccio II Farnese, Duke of Parma, and died in childbirth.
7. Princess Henriette Adelaide Maria of Savoy (6 November 1636 – 18 March 1676) married Ferdinand Maria, Elector of Bavaria, and had issue.
8. Princess Catherine Beatrice of Savoy (6 November 1636 – 26 August 1637) died in infancy.

== Ancestors ==
Ancestors of Christine of France

8. Charles, Duke of Vendôme
4. Antoine of Navarre
9. Françoise of Alençon
2. Henry IV of France
10. Henry II of Navarre
5. Jeanne III of Navarre
11. Marguerite of Angoulême
1. Christine of France
12. Cosimo I de' Medici, Grand Duke of Tuscany
6. Francesco I de' Medici, Grand Duke of Tuscany
13. Eleanor of Toledo
3. Marie de' Medici
14. Ferdinand I, Holy Roman Emperor
7. Joanna of Austria
15. Anne of Bohemia and Hungary

== Sources ==
- Oresko, Robert (2004). "Maria Giovanna Battista of Savoy-Nemours (1644–1724): daughter, consort, and Regent of Savoy". In Campbell Orr, Clarissa (ed.). Queenship in Europe 1660–1815: The Role of the Consort. Cambridge University Press. pp. 16–55. ISBN 0-521-81422-7.
- Parrott, David (1997). "The Mantuan Succession, 1627–31: A Sovereignty Dispute in Early Modern Europe". The English Historical Review. CXII, Issue 445, February (445). Oxford Academic: 20–65. doi:10.1093/ehr/CXII.445.20.

Christine of France House of Bourbon Cadet branch of the Capetian dynasty Born: 10 February 1606 Died: 27 December 1663
French nobility
Preceded by Elisabeth of France	Madame Royale; 25 November 1615 – 10 February 1619	Succeeded by Henrietta Maria of France
Italian royalty
Preceded by Catalina Micaela of Spain	Duchess consort of Savoy; 26 July 1630 – 7 October 1637	Succeeded by Françoise Madeleine d'Orléans
