= Victor Amadeus I =

Duke of Savoy from 1630 to 1637

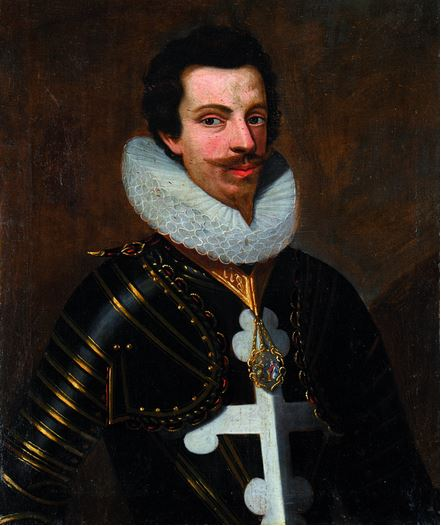

Duke of Savoy
- Reign: 26 July 1630 – 7 October 1637
- Predecessor: Charles Emmanuel I
- Successor: Francis Hyacinth
- Born: 8 May 1587; Turin, Piedmont, Savoy
- Died: 7 October 1637 (aged 50); Vercelli, Piedmont, Savoy
- Burial: Vercelli Cathedral
- Spouse: Princess Christine Marie of France (m. 1619)
- Issue: Princess Luisa Cristina; Francis Hyacinth; Charles Emmanuel II; Margaret Yolande, Duchess of Parma; Henrietta Adelaide, Electress of Bavaria; Princess Catherine Beatrice
- House: Savoy
- Father: Charles Emmanuel I, Duke of Savoy
- Mother: Catherine Micaela of Spain
- Religion: Catholic Church

Victor Amadeus I (Italian: Vittorio Amedeo I di Savoia; 8 May 1587 – 7 October 1637) was the Duke of Savoy and ruler of the Savoyard states from 26 July 1630 until his death in 1637. He was also known as the Lion of Susa.

He was succeeded by two of his sons; Francis Hyacinth and Charles Emmanuel II. His male-only line became extinct in 1831 with the death of Charles Felix. Therefore, the Kings of Italy are descended from his younger brother, Thomas Francis.

== Biography ==
Victor Amadeus was born in Turin, Piedmont, as the second son and child of Charles Emmanuel I, Duke of Savoy and Catalina Micaela of Spain, daughter of King Philip II of Spain. He spent much of his childhood in Madrid at the court of his grandfather Philip II. He stayed there until the king's death in 1598, when Victor Amadeus was eleven. As the second son of the Duke, he was not expected to become Duke of Savoy. That changed when his brother, Filippo Emanuele, died in 1605, thus he became heir-apparent to the Duchy of Savoy and received the homage of the court at Racconigi on 21 January 1607.

Victor Amadeus became Duke of Savoy after his father's death in 1630. Charles Emmanuel's policies had brought great instability in the relationships with both France and Spain, and troops were needed to defend the Duchy. As money was lacking to recruit mercenaries or train indigenous soldiers, Victor Amadeus signed a peace treaty with Spain.

With the Treaty of Cherasco, Savoy was forced to give Pinerolo to France. This gave France a strategic route into the heart of Savoy territory and on into the rest of Italy. The rulers of Savoy from that point resented this loss and worked for decades with the goal of regaining that loss. Subsequently, under the direction of Cardinal Richelieu, Victor Amadeus attempted to create an anti-Spanish league in Italy. He achieved two victories against the Spanish: In 1636 in the Battle of Tornavento and on 8 September 1637 in the Battle of Mombaldone.

== Death ==
On 25 September 1637, Victor Amadeus fell ill after a dinner offered by the Duke of Créqui. A prominent Savoyard noble (Count Augusto Manfredo Scaglia di Verrua) who attended the dinner also died in the same week, arousing suspicions of poisoning and generating uncertainty in Savoyard-French relations. The duke was carried to Vercelli, where he died on 7 October, aged 50. He was first succeeded by his elder son, Francis Hyacinth. However, Francis died the following year, and his younger son, Charles Emmanuel, became Charles Emmanuel II of Savoy.

== Marriage and issue ==
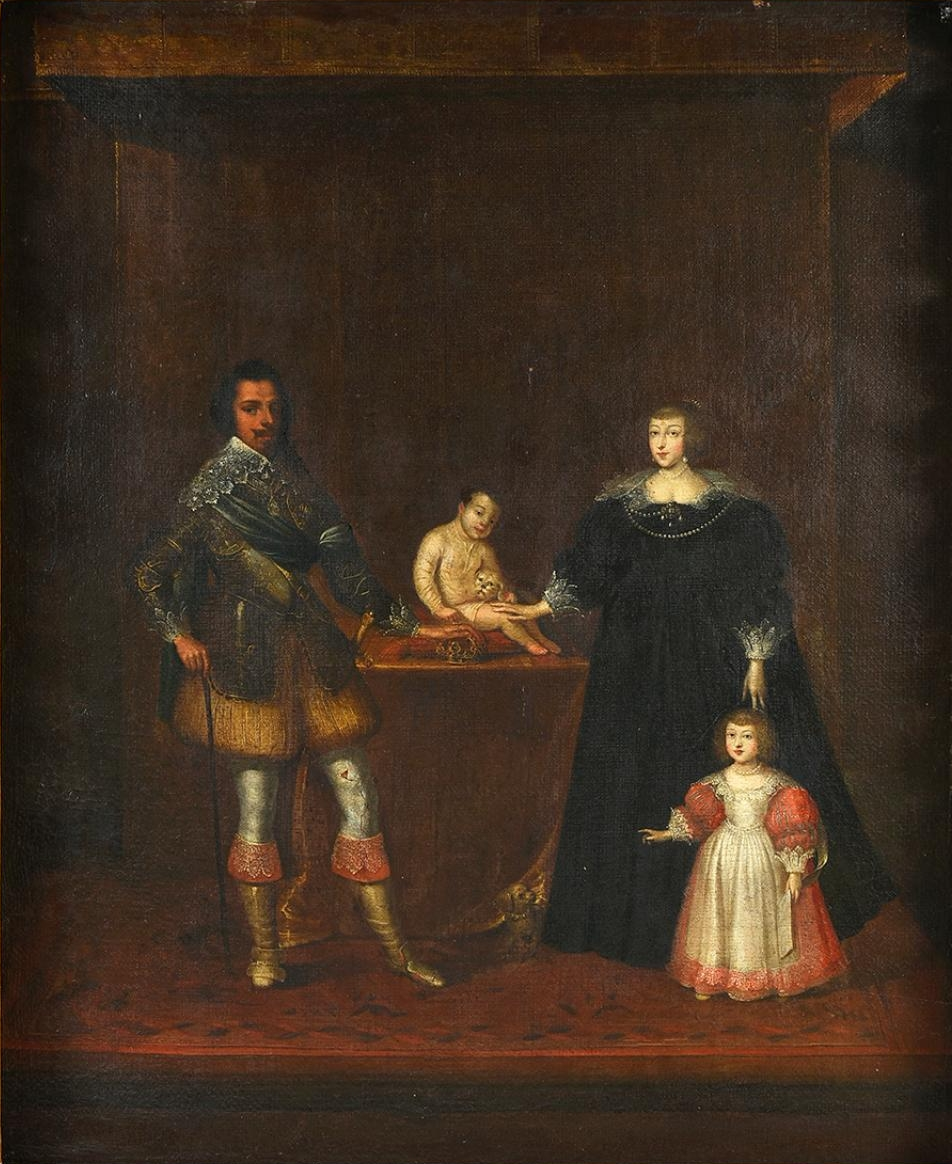
Victor Amadeus I of Savoy, Christine of France and their children

In 1619, he married Christine Marie of France, a daughter of Henry IV of France and Marie de' Medici. Following his death, she served as regent of the Duchy from 1637 to 1663. They had children including:

- Stillborn son (1621)
- Prince Louis Amadeus of Savoy (Turin, 24 February 1622 – Turin, 29 January 1628)
- Princess Luisa Cristina of Savoy (Turin, 27 July 1629 – Turin, 14 May 1692), married her uncle Prince Maurice of Savoy
- Prince Francis Hyacinth of Savoy (Turin, 14 September 1632 – Castello del Valentino, 4 October 1638), Duke of Savoy
- Prince Charles Emmanuel of Savoy (20 June 1634 – Palace of Venaria, 12 June 1675), Duke of Savoy; married first his first cousin Françoise Madeleine d'Orléans and had no issue; secondly married another first cousin Marie Jeanne of Savoy
- Margaret Yolande of Savoy (Turin, 15 November 1635 – Parma, 29 April 1663), married Ranuccio II Farnese, Duke of Parma
- Princess Henrietta Adelaide Marie of Savoy (Turin, 6 November 1636 – Munich, 18 March 1676), married Ferdinand Maria of Wittelsbach, Elector of Bavaria
- Princess Catherine Beatrice of Savoy (Turin, 6 November 1636 – Turin, 26 August 1637) twin of the above

== Ancestry ==
Ancestors of Victor Amadeus I

8. Charles III, Duke of Savoy
4. Emmanuel Philibert, Duke of Savoy
9. Beatrice of Portugal
2. Charles Emmanuel I, Duke of Savoy
10. Francis I of France
5. Margaret, Duchess of Berry
11. Claude, Duchess of Brittany
1. Victor Amadeus I, Duke of Savoy
12. Charles V, Holy Roman Emperor
6. Philip II of Spain
13. Isabella of Portugal
3. Infanta Catherine Michaela of Spain
14. Henry II of France
7. Elisabeth of Valois
15. Catherine de' Medici

== Sources ==
- Osborne, Toby (2007). Dynasty and diplomacy in the court of Savoy: political culture and the Thirty Years' War. Cambridge: Cambridge University Press. ISBN 978-0-521-03791-4. OCLC 124025562.
- Storrs, Christopher (1999). War, Diplomacy and the Rise of Savoy 1690–1720. Cambridge University Press. ISBN 0521551463.
- Symcox, Geoffrey (1997). "From commune to capital: the transformation of Turin, sixteenth to eighteenth centuries". In Oresko, Robert; Gibbs, G. C.; Scott, H. M. (eds.). Royal and Republican Sovereignty in Early Modern Europe: Essays in Memory of Ragnhild Hatton. Cambridge University Press. pp. 242–271. ISBN 9780521419109.

Victor Amadeus I House of Savoy Born: 8 May 1587 Died: 7 October 1637
Regnal titles
Preceded by Charles Emmanuel I	Duke of Savoy; 1630–1637	Succeeded by Francis Hyacinth
