= Rinaldo Taverna =

Count Rinaldo Taverna
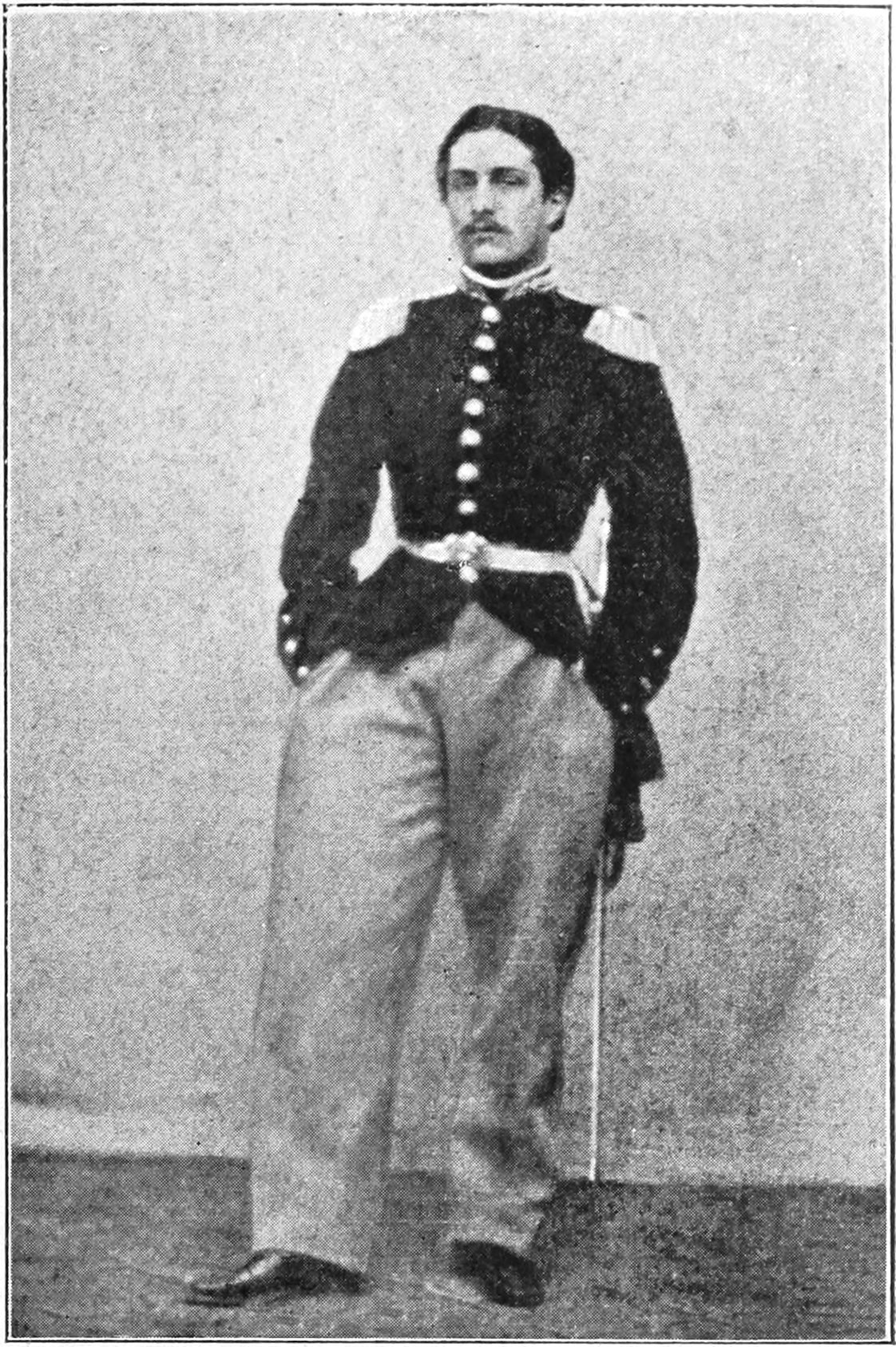

Director of the Italian Red Cross
- In office 9 April 1896 – 6 May 1913

Personal details
- Born: May 6, 1839 Milan, Austrian Empire
- Died: May 6, 1913
- Spouse: Countess Lavinia Boncompagni (m. 1878)
- Occupation: General, politician
- Awards: Knight of the Grand Cross of the Order of Saints Maurice and Lazarus; Knight of the Grand Cross of the Order of the Crown of Italy

Military service
- Service branch: Piedmontese Army
- Battles/wars: Marche and Perugia campaign (1850)

Count Rinaldo Taverna (6 May 1839 – 6 May 1913) was an Italian politician and general. He served as senator in the 7th legislature.

He was born in Milan, Austrian Empire, and trained at the military school at Ivrea, from where he was appointed sub-lieutenant of the Piedmontese army. In 1850, he saw battle in Marche and Perugia. In 1868, he traveled to Berlin to study military organization. In 1874, he was elected deputy from Monza to the parliament. In 1890, he was named senator. He was nearly sent to Berlin as ambassador. He became the director of the Italian Red Cross (Croce Rossa), a post he held for 15 years (9 April 1896 - 6 May 1913), supervising efforts to provide for those affected by the earthquakes of Messina (1908) and Reggio, and the war in Libya. In 1878, he married Countess Lavinia Boncompagni. He was knighted both as knight of the great cross of the Order of Santi Maurizio e Lazzaro and knight of the great cross of the Order of the Crown of Italy.
