= Trevena =

Trevena may refer to:

- Trevena, Cornwall, a village in the UK more widely known as Tintagel
- Trevena Inc., a biotechnology company in Pennsylvania, USA

== List of people with the surname ==
- Claire Trevena, Canadian government minister
- John Trevena, pseudonym used by the Canadian writer Ernest George Henham
- Leo Trevena, Australian rugby league footballer and coach

== See also ==
- Trévenans
- John Trevenant
