= Prince Maurice of Savoy =

Savoyard prince

Maurice
- Cardinal of the Holy Roman Church
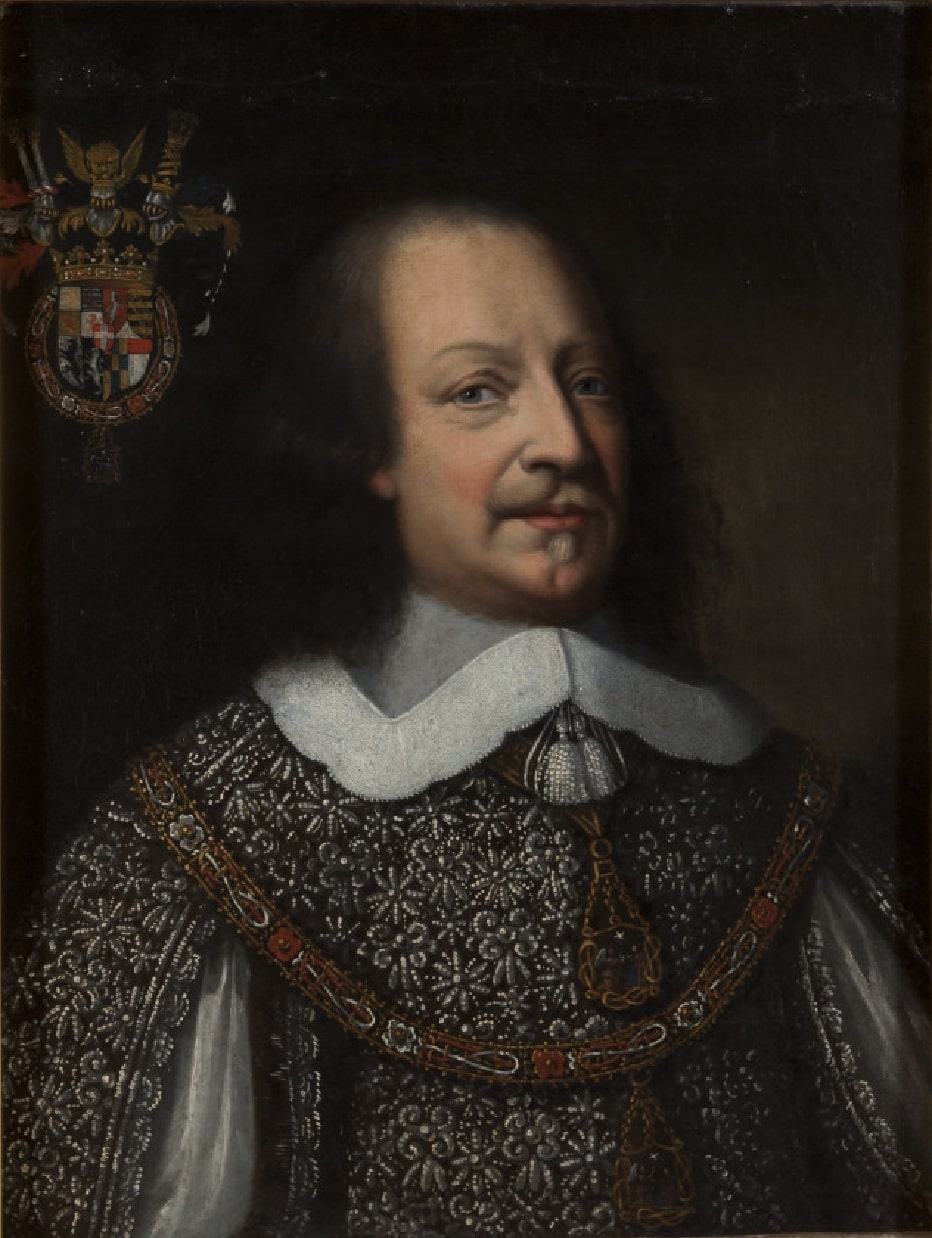

Prince of Oneglia
- Tenure: 13 August 1642 – 3 October 1657
- Born: 10 January 1593; Turin, Duchy of Savoy
- Died: 4 October 1657 (aged 64); Vigna di Madama, Turin, Duchy of Savoy
- Burial: Sacra di San Michele
- Spouse: Princess Luisa Cristina of Savoy (m. 1642)
- House: House of Savoy
- Father: Charles Emmanuel I, Duke of Savoy
- Mother: Catalina Micaela of Spain

Maurice of Savoy (10 January 1593 – 3 October 1657, Turin) was an Italian nobleman, politician and cardinal. He was the fourth son of Charles Emmanuel I, Duke of Savoy and Infanta Catalina Micaela of Spain.

== Life ==
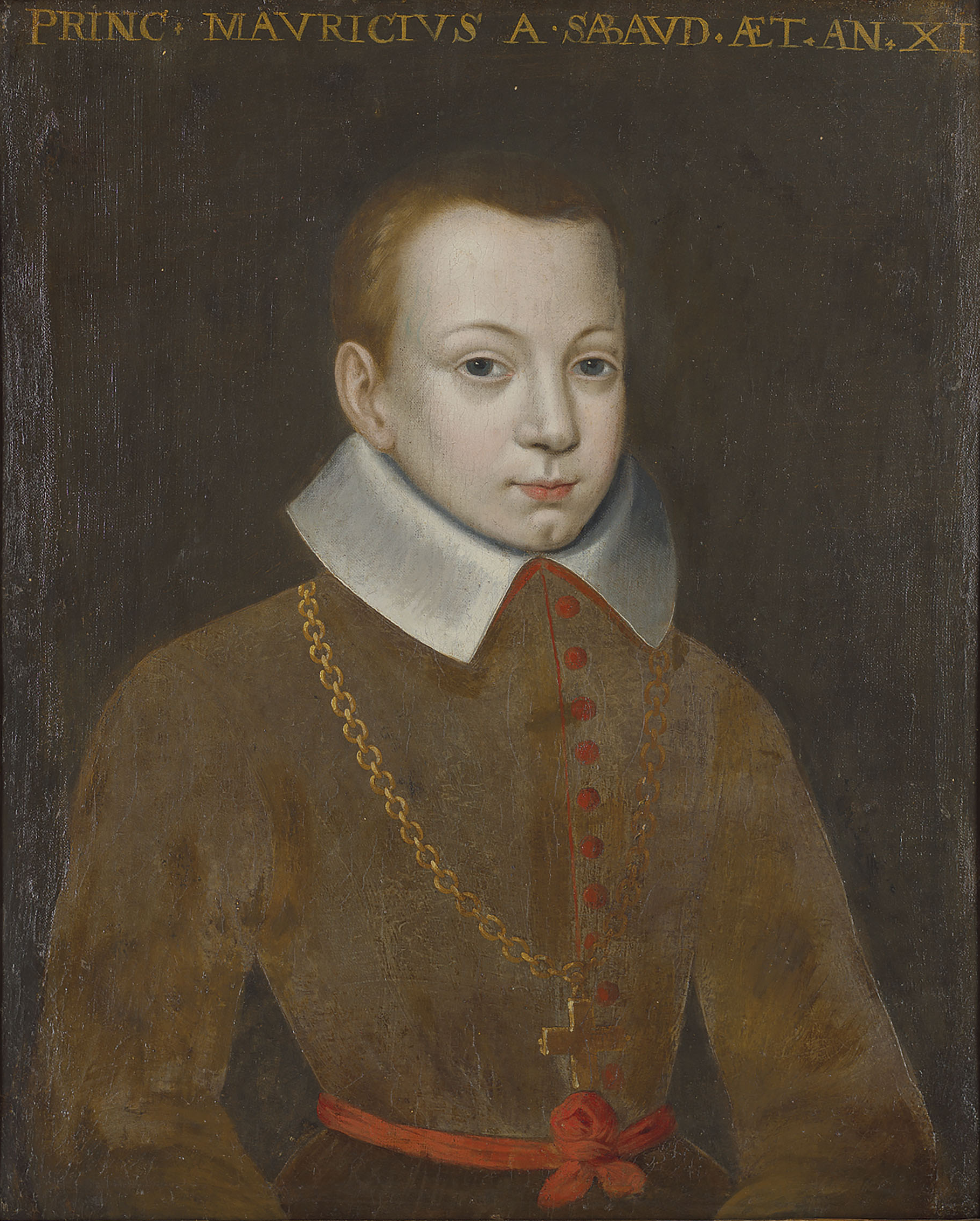
Maurice as a young boy

Born in Turin, Maurice was the fourth of the five legitimate sons of Charles Emmanuel I, Duke of Savoy and his wife Catalina, Infanta of Spain, daughter of King Philip II. Following what was the custom for the younger members of Italian princely families, Maurice was educated for a life in the Church, and then sent to the papal capital to promote the interests of the House of Savoy. At the age of fifteen, he was made a cardinal by Pope Paul V in a bull dated 27 March 1608. In 1618, he was sent to Paris to complete the arrangements for the marriage of his brother Victor Amadeus with Christine of France. Maurice received the red hat on 18 February 1621. He participated in the conclave of 1623 and had a decisive role in the election of Pope Urban VIII. From 1623 to 1630, he lived sumptuously in Rome as a member of the papal household and as a lavish patron of the arts. Maurice was well received in the papal capital, esteemed for his piousness and exemplary behavior. The House of Savoy was known for its close relationship with the Theatines, and the Cardinal propagated this interest in religious orders by supporting the Oratorians, who were particularly dear to his heart because of the special devotion he felt towards their founder, Philip Neri.

Apart from his life in the Church, Maurice of Savoy was also the prince of a ruling dynasty, a man of letters, and a significant figure in the arts. During his sojourn in Rome, he transformed his palace in Monte Giordano (the former Palazzo Orsini) into a magnificent court, characterized by intellectual and artistic endeavors. Various artists resided at the court, among them his private painter Giovanni Giacomo Semenza, the poet Ludovico d'Agliè, and the composer Michelangelo Rossi. The Cardinal patronized a broad range of Rome's cultural elite, including the historian-orator Agostino Mascardi, the artists Domenichino and Antonio Tempesta, and the musicians and composers Sigismondo d'India and Stefano Landi. In 1626, he founded the artistic and literary Accademia dei Desiosi, one of the most significant of the Roman academies of the time. The academy met in the Cardinal's palace in Monte Giordano. Maurice remained in the Eternal City until 1630. In the next ten years he was ambassador of Savoy both in Paris and in Rome.

In 1637, his elder brother Victor Amadeus I suddenly died, leaving a five-year-old heir with his wife Christine Marie of France as regent. Cardinal Maurice hurried back from Paris to join his brother Thomas in plans to seize the power of regency. The two brothers were supported both financially and politically by Spain. Christine Marie vainly begged Richelieu for protection, while the nobles and the people divided into two groups. The "Madamisti" favored the Madama Reale and the French. The "Cardinalisti" and the "Principisti" supported Cardinal Maurice and Prince Thomas. The "Principisti", had considerable support among ordinary Piedmontese, who resented the French presence; the "Madamisti" included a number of powerful families, notably the d'Aglié clan.

In the spring of 1639, the two princes attacked the fort and ammunition depot of Vercelli, seized the supplies and marched on Turin. They held the fortress inside the city walls for 155 days while it was besieged by soldiers of Christine Marie and of the French general Henri, Count of Harcourt. Military reversals and the reductions of their pensions from Spain caused the two princes to renounce their claims to the regency and to sue for peace. Giulio Mazzarino, who had succeeded Richelieu as Cardinal of France, acted as mediator in the peace conferences between Christine Marie and the two princes.

In 1642, Maurice gave up the cardinal's purple robes to become prince of Oneglia. On 28 August 1642, he married his brother Victor Amadeus' daughter, Princess Luisa Cristina of Savoy in Turin. The two moved to Nice where Maurice was the governor of the city. Having returned to Piedmont in 1652, Maurice settled first in Chieri and then in his villa in Turin. Late in life, he left active politics and devoted himself to literature and science. He established the Accademia dei Solinghi also known as the Accademia dei Solitari, whose members took part in artistic, philosophical and mathematical discussion. Prince Maurice died in Turin on 4 October 1657 and was buried in the cathedral of Turin. His eulogy was written by the great baroque orator Emanuele Tesauro. Maurice left his villa and his large art collection to his wife Luisa Cristina. Luisa Cristina did not remarry and on her own death left many of her husband’s paintings to her nephew Victor Amadeus II, thus enriching the holdings of the ducal court. In 1836, Maurice's remains, together with those of his wife, were moved to the Sacra di San Michele.

== Ancestry ==
Ancestors of Prince Maurice of Savoy

8. Charles III, Duke of Savoy
4. Emmanuel Philibert, Duke of Savoy
9. Beatrice of Portugal
2. Charles Emmanuel I, Duke of Savoy
10. Francis I of France
5. Margaret, Duchess of Berry
11. Claude, Duchess of Brittany
1. Maurice of Savoy
12. Charles V, Holy Roman Emperor
6. Philip II of Spain
13. Isabella of Portugal
3. Catherine Michaela of Austria
14. Henry II of France
7. Elisabeth of Valois
15. Catherine de' Medici

== Bibliography ==
- Vallauri, Tommaso (1844). Delle Società letterarie del Piemonte. Florence: Tip. dei fratelli Favale. pp. 46, 88 ff., 123. Archived from the original on 2025-04-12.
- Ricotti, Ercole (1869). Storia della monarchia piemontese. Florence: G. Barbera.
- Gianazzo di Pamparato, Vittorio Enrico (1891). Il principe cardinale Maurizio di Savoia mecenate dei letterati e degli artisti. Turin: G. B. Paravia.
- Randi, Luigi (1901). Il Principe Cardinale Maurizio Di Savoia. Florence: Scuola tip. Salesiana.
- Di Macco, Michela (1995). "«L'ornamento del principe». Cultura figurativa di Maurizio di Savoia (1619-1627)". In Giovanni Romano (ed.). Le collezioni di Carlo Emanuele I di Savoia. Turin: Fondazione CRT, Cassa di risparmio di Torino. pp. 349–374.
- Mörschel, Tobias (2001). "Il cardinale Maurizio di Savoia e la presenza sabauda a Roma all'inizio del XVII secolo". Dimensioni e Problemi della Ricerca Storica. 2: 147–178.
- Oresko, Robert (2003). "Cardinal Maurice [Maurizio] of Savoy". Grove Art Online. Oxford University Press. doi:10.1093/oao/9781884446054.013.90000373203.
- Boiteux, Martine (2015). "Il principe cardinale Maurizio di Savoia a Roma tra mecenatismo e effimero". In Jean François Chauvard; Andrea Merlotti; Maria Antonietta Visceglia (eds.). Casa Savoia e curia romana dal Cinquecento al Risorgimento. Rome: École française de Rome. pp. 387–409. doi:10.1400/236308. ISBN 978-2-7283-1082-1.
- Morales, Jorge (2016). "Le prince-cardinal Maurice de Savoie et les arts. Une esthétisation de l'identité nobiliaire au palais Orsini de Montegiordano à Rome". Seizième Siècle. 12 (12): 277–307. JSTOR 26625843.
- Cozzo, Paolo (2018). "SAVOIA, Maurizio di". Dizionario Biografico degli Italiani (in Italian). Vol. 91: Savoia–Semeria. Rome: Istituto dell'Enciclopedia Italiana. ISBN 978-88-12-00032-6.
- Jorge Morales; Cristina Santarelli; Franca Varallo, eds. (2023). Il Cardinale. Maurizio di Savoia, mecenate, diplomatico e politico (1593-1657). Rome: Carocci editore. ISBN 978-8829015269.
