= Francis Hyacinth, Duke of Savoy =

Duke of Savoy from 1637 to 1638

Francis Hyacinth
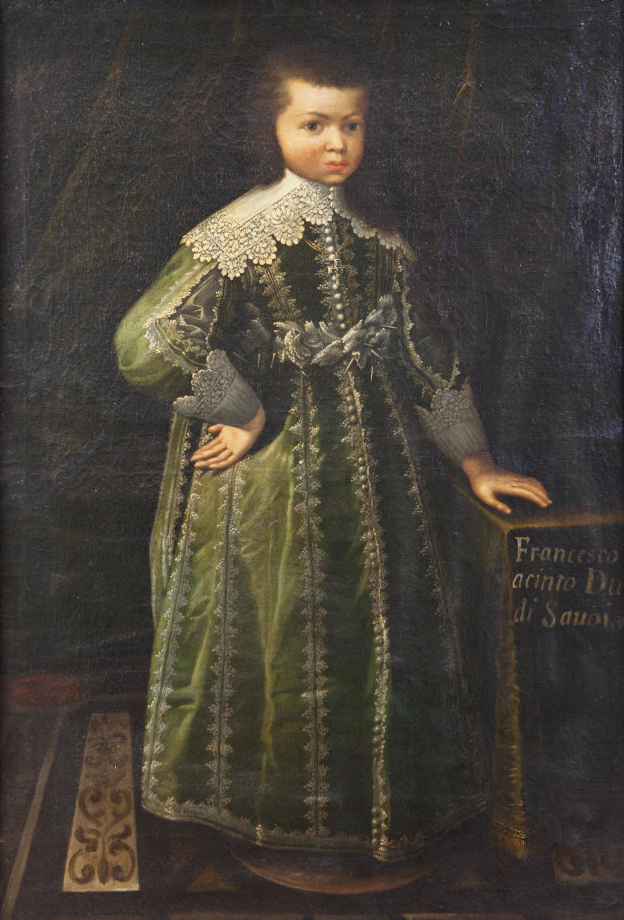
- Portrait by Francesco Cairo, between 1635–1650

Duke of Savoy
- Reign: 7 October 1637 – 4 October 1638
- Predecessor: Victor Amadeus I
- Successor: Charles Emmanuel II
- Regent: Christine of France
- Born: 14 September 1632; Castle of Valentino, Turin, Savoy
- Died: 4 October 1638 (aged 6); Castle of Valentino
- Burial: Sacra di San Michele
Names
- Francesco Giacinto di Savoia
- House: Savoy
- Father: Victor Amadeus I, Duke of Savoy
- Mother: Christine of France

Francis Hyacinth (Italian: Francesco Giacinto; 14 September 1632 – 4 October 1638) was Duke of Savoy and ruler of the Savoyard states under the regency of his mother Christine Marie.

== Biography ==
Born at the Castle of Valentino in Turin he was the eldest surviving son of Victor Amadeus I, Duke of Savoy and his wife Christine Marie of France. As the heir to the Savoyard throne, he was styled as the Prince of Piedmont. His parents had another son who had died in 1628 before the birth of Francis Hyacinth.

At his father's death in October 1637, he succeeded and his mother took power having been acclaimed regent. While Duke of Savoy he also held the subsidiary titles of Marquess of Saluzzo, count of Aosta, Moriana and Nice, and claimant King of Jerusalem. The infant was nicknamed the Flower of Paradise (French: Fleur de Paradis). Having succeeded his father at such a young age, Francis Hyacinth did not rule de facto being only 5 years old. Having caught a fever, he died at the Castle of Valentino, and was succeeded by his brother Charles Emmanuel II. The child was buried at the Sacra di San Michele in Turin.

== Ancestry ==
Ancestors of Francis Hyacinth, Duke of Savoy

8. Emmanuel Philibert, Duke of Savoy
4. Charles Emmanuel I, Duke of Savoy
9. Margaret, Duchess of Berry
2. Victor Amadeus I, Duke of Savoy
10. Philip II of Spain
5. Catherine Michelle of Austria
11. Elisabeth of Valois
1. Francis Hyacinth, Duke of Savoy
12. Anthony of Navarre
6. Henry IV of France
13. Joan III of Navarre
3. Christine of France
14. Francesco I de' Medici, Grand Duke of Tuscany
7. Marie de' Medici
15. Joanna of Austria

Francis Hyacinth, Duke of Savoy House of Savoy Born: 14 September 1632 Died: 4 October 1638
Regnal titles
Preceded by Victor Amadeus I	Duke of Savoy; 1637–1638	Succeeded by Charles Emmanuel II
