= Castello del Valentino =

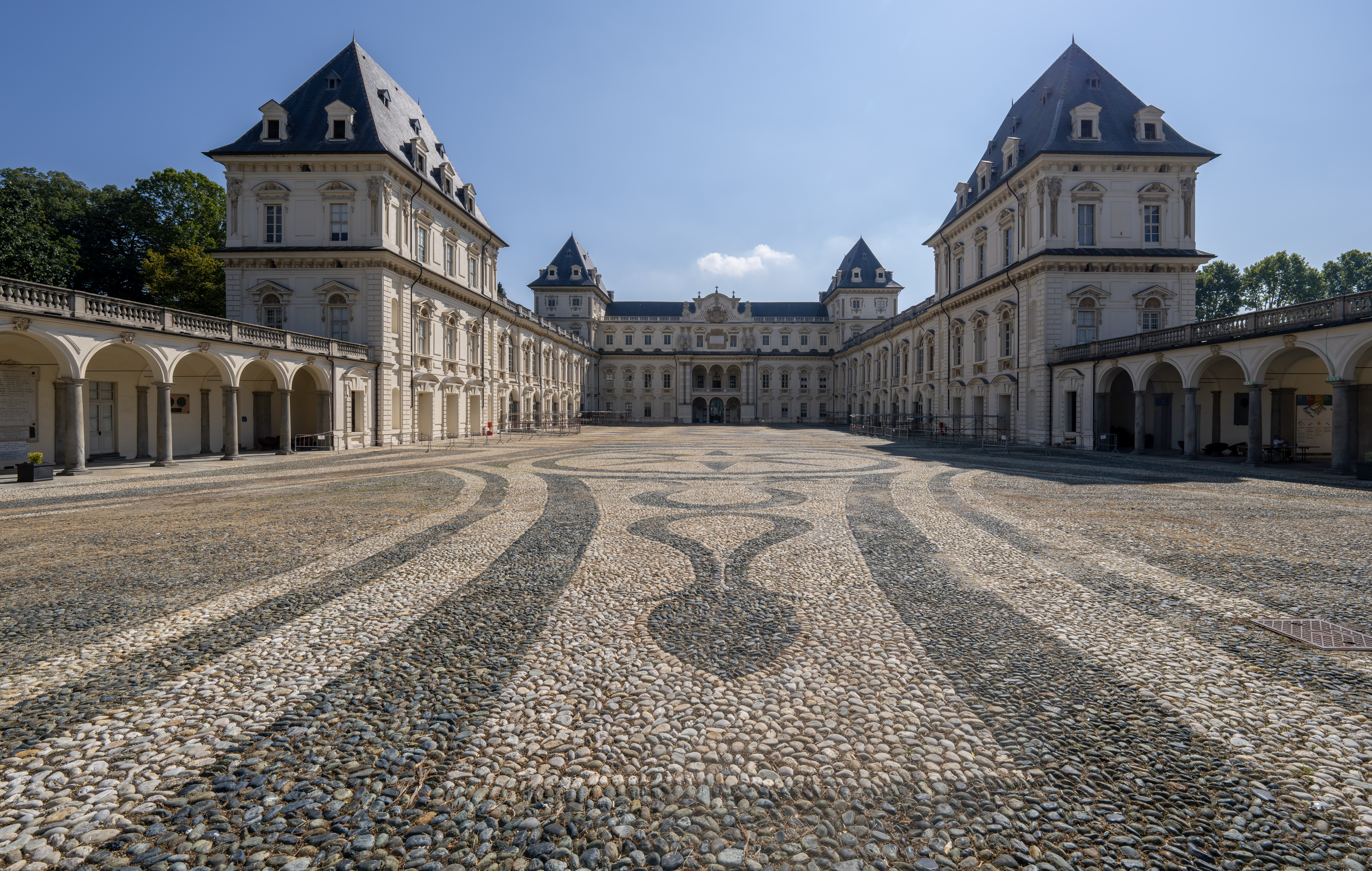
- Façade of the castle
- Interactive map of the Castello del Valentino area

General information
- Location: Turin, Italy
- Coordinates: 45°03′15.6″N 7°41′07.9″E
- Owner: Polytechnic University of Turin

UNESCO World Heritage Site
- Location: Turin, Italy
- Criteria: (i) (ii) (iv) (v)
- Reference: 823bis
- Inscription: 1997 (21st Session)

The Valentino Castle (Italian: Castello del Valentino) is a historic building in the northwestern Italian city of Turin. It is located in Parco del Valentino, and is the seat of the Architecture Faculty of the Polytechnic University of Turin. It is one of the Residences of the Royal House of Savoy included in the list of UNESCO World Heritage Sites in 1997.

== History ==
The ancient castle was bought by Duke Emmanuel Philibert of Savoy on the advice of Andrea Palladio. The name Valentino, first mentioned in 1275, seems to derive from a saint called Valentine whose relics were venerated in a church which stood nearby.

The current structure is due to Princess Christine of France (1606–1663), wife of Victor Amadeus I, who dwelt here from 1630. Architect Carlo di Castellamonte renovated the construction substantially, with the help of his son Amedeo. Works started around 1633 and lasted until 1660.

It has a horseshoe shape, with four rectangular towers, one at each angle, and a wide inner court with a marble pavement. The ceilings of the false upper floors are clearly in transalpino (i.e. French) style. The façade sports a huge coat of arms of the House of Savoy.

Minor modifications were made in the early nineteenth century; at this time, too, much of the seventeenth-century furniture was carried off by French troops. For the next half century the palace was more or less abandoned and fell into a state of disrepair. Renovations were carried out in 1860 when it was selected as the seat of the engineering faculty of Turin; it has been further restored in recent years.

In April 2024, pro-Palestinian protesters disrupted a conference at the castle. Security forces prevented the majority of protesters from entering, though one protester carrying a Palestinian flag did gain entry, and seven officers were injured during the incident. Prime Minister Giorgia Meloni condemned the protests.

Today it is the central building of the Architecture faculty of the Polytechnic University of Turin.

The Orto Botanico dell'Università di Torino, a historic botanical garden in the castle grounds.
