= Charles Emmanuel II =

Duke of Savoy from 1638 to 1675

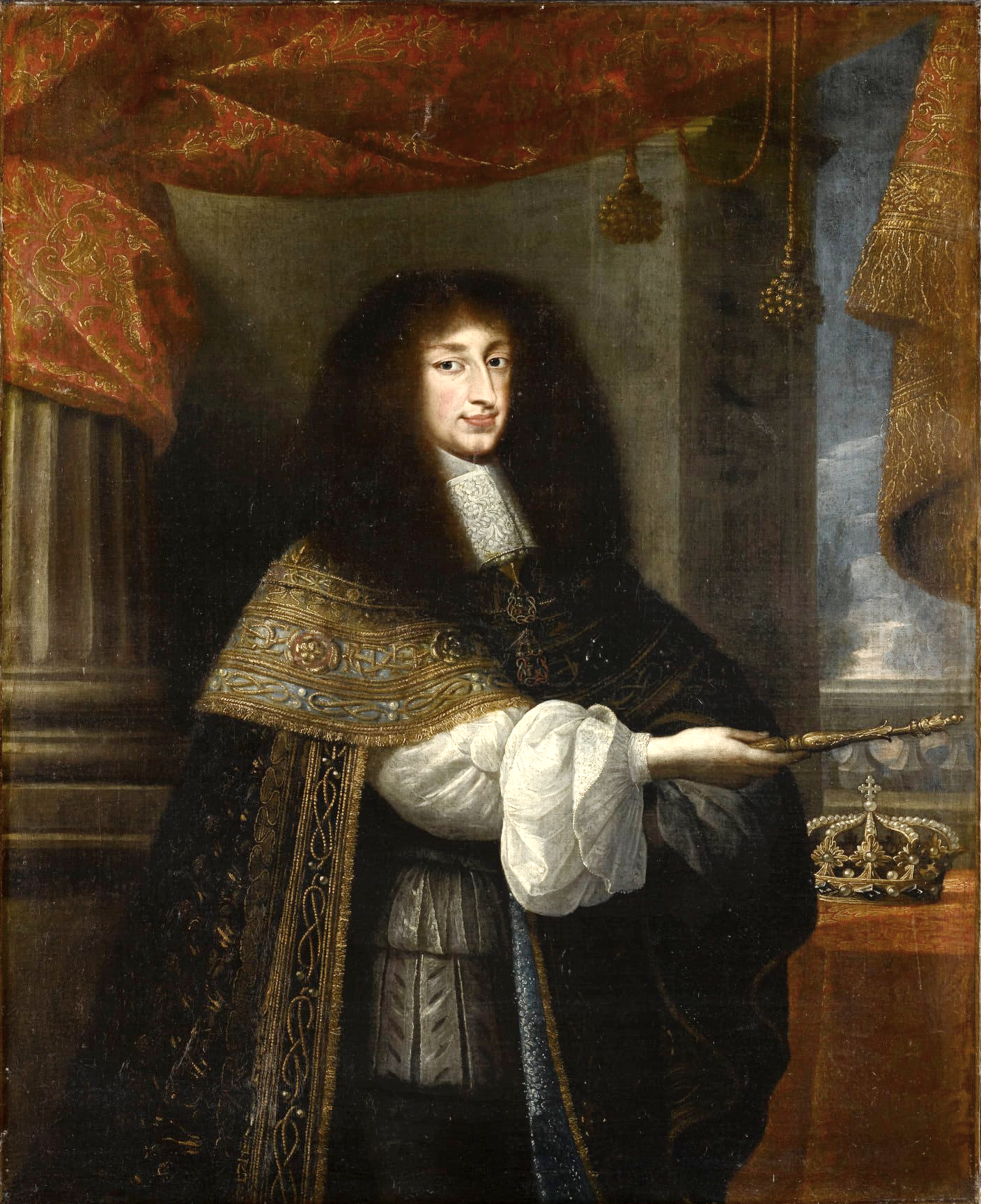
- Portrait, c. 1660–1675

Duke of Savoy
- Reign: 4 October 1638 – 12 June 1675
- Predecessor: Francis Hyacinth
- Successor: Victor Amadeus II
- Regent: Christine of France (1638–1648)
- Born: 20 June 1634; Turin, Savoy
- Died: 12 June 1675 (aged 40); Turin, Savoy
- Burial: Turin Cathedral
- Spouse: Françoise Madeleine d'Orléans (m. 1663; died 1664) Marie Jeanne of Savoy (m. 1665)
- Issue: Victor Amadeus II of Savoy
Names
- Carlo Emanuele di Savoia
- House: Savoy
- Father: Victor Amadeus I, Duke of Savoy
- Mother: Christine of France
- Religion: Catholic Church

Charles Emmanuel II (Italian: Carlo Emanuele II di Savoia); 20 June 1634 – 12 June 1675) was Duke of Savoy and ruler of the Savoyard states from 4 October 1638 until his death in 1675 and under regency of his mother Christine of France until 1648. He was also Marquis of Saluzzo, Count of Aosta, Geneva, Moriana and Nice, as well as claimant king of Cyprus, Jerusalem and Armenia. At his death in 1675, his second wife Marie Jeanne Baptiste of Savoy-Nemours acted as regent for their 9-year-old son.

== Biography ==
He was born in Turin to Victor Amadeus I, Duke of Savoy, and Christine of France. His maternal grandparents were Henry IV of France and his second wife Marie de' Medici. In 1638 at the death of his older brother Francis Hyacinth, Duke of Savoy, Charles Emmanuel succeeded to the duchy of Savoy at the age of 4. His mother governed in his place, and even after reaching adulthood in 1648, he invited her to continue to rule. Charles Emmanuel continued a life of pleasure, far away from the affairs of state.

He became notorious for his persecution of the Vaudois (Waldensians) culminating in the massacre of 1655, known as Piedmontese Easter. The massacre was so brutal that it prompted the English poet John Milton to write the sonnet On the Late Massacre in Piedmont. Oliver Cromwell, Lord Protector, called for a general fast in England and proposed to send the British Navy if the massacre was not stopped while gathering funds for helping the Waldensians. Sir Samuel Morland was commissioned with that task. He later wrote The History of the Evangelical Churches of the Valleys of Piemont (1658). The 1655 massacre was only the beginning of a series of conflicts, the Savoyard–Waldensian wars (1655–1690), that saw Waldensian rebels use guerrilla warfare tactics against ducal military campaigns to enforce Roman Catholicism upon the entire population.

Only after the death of his mother in 1663, did he really assume power. He was not successful in gaining a passage to the sea at the expense of Genoa (Second Genoese–Savoyard War, 1672–1673), and had difficulties in retaining the influence of his powerful neighbour France.

But he greatly improved commerce and wealth in the Duchy, developing the port of Nice and building a road through the Alps towards France. He also reformed the army, which until then was mostly composed of mercenaries: he formed instead five Piedmontese regiments and recreated cavalry, as well as introducing uniforms. He also restored fortifications. He constructed many beautiful buildings in Turin, for instance, the Palazzo Reale.

He died on 12 June 1675, leaving his second wife as regent for his son. He is buried at Turin Cathedral.

In 1672, the duke had allowed Hortense Mancini, Duchess of Mazarin to take refuge in Chambéry. She was fleeing from an unhappy marriage to Armand Charles de La Porte, 2nd Duke of La Meilleraye and needed protection. As a young man the duke had unsuccessfully sought her hand in marriage and it is possible that an affair began at this time. Goldsmith notes, "Charles-Emmanuel's delight in hosting the runaway Duchess Mazarin quickly developed into an obsessive fascination once he became more closely acquainted with her.”

However, her presence at court led to tension with supporters of the duchess Marie Jeanne Baptiste de Savoie. Goldsmith notes, "Members of the court who favored the Savoyard duchess, who found herself eclipsed in her husband’s attentions by the exotic Hortense, were quick to pick quarrels with Hortense and her circle." When the duke died, his wife became regent and made it clear that Hortense was not welcome in the kingdom any longer. She left Savoy in October 1675."

== Marriages and issue ==
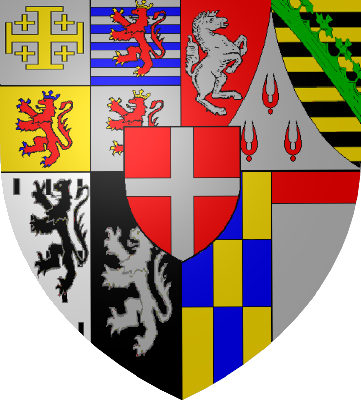
Coat of Arms of the Dukes of Savoy after Victor Amadeus I

Charles Emmanuel first met Marie Jeanne of Savoy in 1659 and fell in love with her. However, his mother disagreed with the pairing, and encouraged him to marry Françoise Madeleine d'Orléans, daughter of his maternal uncle Gaston, Duke of Orléans, the younger brother of his mother Christine Marie. They were married on 3 April 1663. The couple had no issue. His mother died at the end of 1663, and his first wife died at the start of 1664. This left him free to get married on 20 May 1665 to Marie Jeanne of Savoy. They had one son:

- Victor Amadeus II of Sardinia (1666–1732), future King of Sicily and later Sardinia; married Anne Marie d'Orléans and had issue; had illegitimate issue also; married Anna Canalis di Cumiana in a morganatic marriage

From his relationship with Jeanne Marie Benso (née de Trécesson), Marchioness of Cavour (the wife of Maurizio Pompilio Benso, Marquess of Cavour), he had a daughter, Cristina Ippolita of Savoy (1655–1730), who married Carlo Besso Ferrero Fieschi, 4th Prince of Masserano.

== Ancestors ==
Ancestors of Charles Emmanuel II

8. Emmanuel Philibert, Duke of Savoy
4. Charles Emmanuel I, Duke of Savoy
9. Margaret, Duchess of Berry
2. Victor Amadeus I, Duke of Savoy
10. Philip II of Spain
5. Catherine Michelle of Austria
11. Elisabeth of Valois
1. Charles Emmanuel II, Duke of Savoy
12. Anthony of Navarre
6. Henry IV of France
13. Joan III of Navarre
3. Christine of France
14. Francesco I de' Medici, Grand Duke of Tuscany
7. Marie de' Medici
15. Joanna of Austria

Charles Emmanuel II House of Savoy Born: 20 June 1634 Died: 12 June 1675
Regnal titles
Preceded by Francis Hyacinth	Duke of Savoy; 1638–1675	Succeeded by Victor Amadeus II
