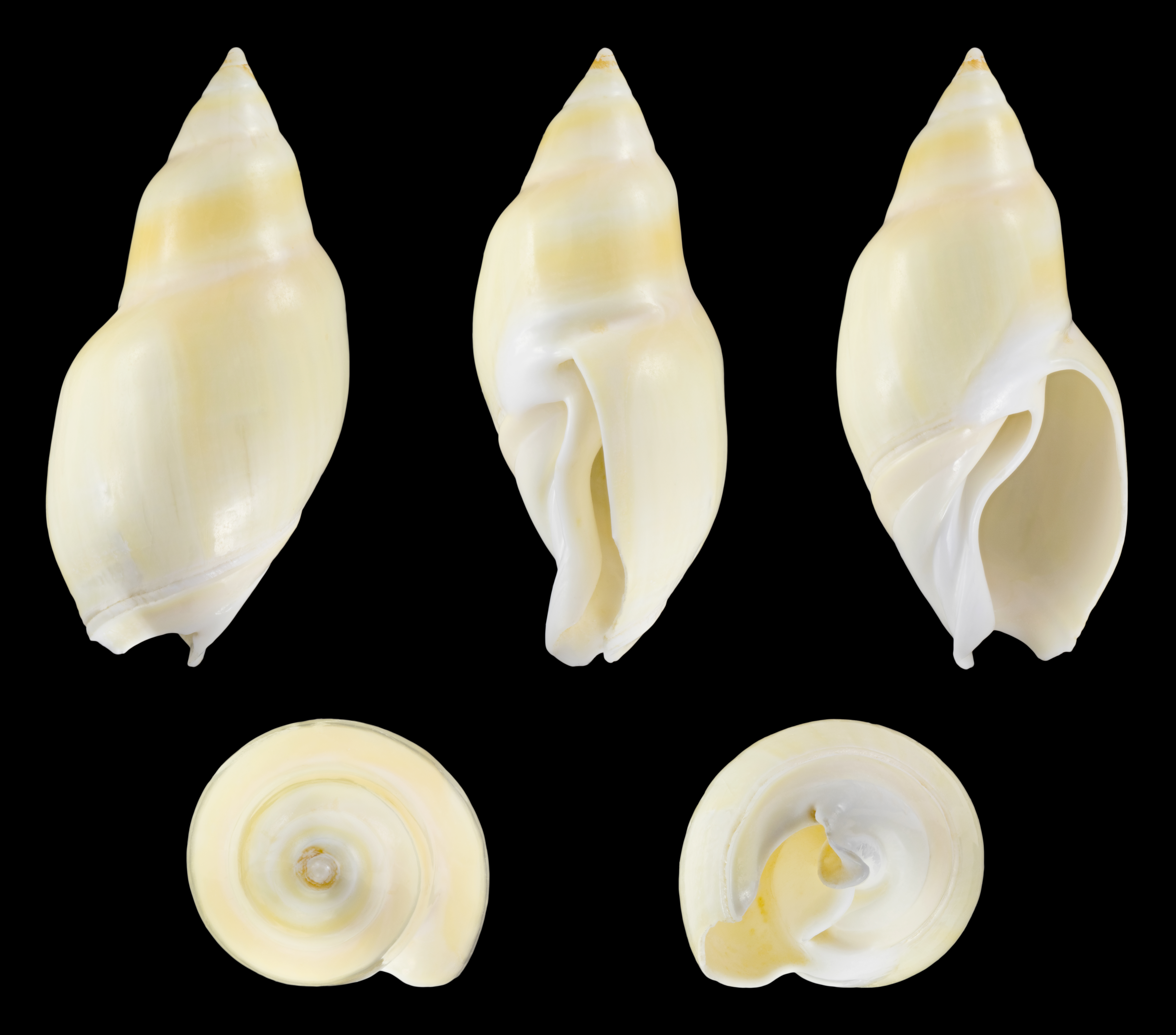
- Eburna glabrata (Swainson, 1825) a senior synonym of Eburna flavida Lamarck, 1801, type species of the genus Eburna

Scientific classification
- Kingdom: Animalia
- Phylum: Mollusca
- Class: Gastropoda
- Subclass: Caenogastropoda
- Order: Neogastropoda
- Superfamily: Olivoidea
- Family: Ancillariidae
- Genus: Eburna; Lamarck, 1801

Type species
- Eburna flavida Lamarck, 1801

Synonyms
- Dipsaccus H. Adams & A. Adams, 1853

= Eburna =

Genus of gastropods

Eburna is a genus of sea snails, marine gastropod mollusks in the family Ancillariidae.

== Description ==
The shell is fusiformly cylindrical, polished and solid. It is generally deeply umbilicated. The spire is elevated. The suture is covered with enamel. The aperture is oval and elongated. The inner lip is tortuous. The outer lip is acute, with a slight tooth on the fore part.

== Species ==
The genus Eburna currently includes three accepted species:

- Eburna balteata (Swainson, 1825)
- Eburna glabrata (Linnaeus, 1758)
- Eburna lienardii (Bernardi, 1858)

Previously valid species brought into synonymy include:

- Eburna ambulacrum G. B. Sowerby I, 1825: synonym of Babylonia ambulacrum (G. B. Sowerby I, 1825) (original combination)
- Eburna australis G. B. Sowerby I, 1833: synonym of Zemira australis (G. B. Sowerby I, 1833) (original combination)
- Eburna borneensis G. B. Sowerby II, 1864: synonym of Babylonia borneensis (G. B. Sowerby II, 1864) (original combination)
- Eburna chemnitziana Fischer von Waldheim, 1807: synonym of Babylonia areolata (Link, 1807)
- Eburna chrysostoma G. B. Sowerby II, 1866: synonym of Babylonia spirata (Linnaeus, 1758)
- Eburna flavida Lamarck, 1801 : synonym of Eburna glabrata (Linnaeus, 1758)
- Eburna formosae G. B. Sowerby II, 1866: synonym of Babylonia formosae (G. B. Sowerby II, 1866) (original combination)
- Eburna immaculata Jousseaume, 1883: synonym of Babylonia ambulacrum (G. B. Sowerby I, 1825)
- Eburna japonica Reeve, 1842: synonym of Babylonia japonica (Reeve, 1842) (original combination)
- Eburna lienardi (Bernardi, 1859) : synonym of Eburna lienardii (Bernardi, 1859) (misspelling)
- Eburna lutosa Lamarck, 1816: synonym of Babylonia lutosa (Lamarck, 1816) (original combination)
- Eburna millepunctata Turton, 1932: synonym of Zemiropsis papillaris (G. B. Sowerby I, 1825)
- Eburna mirabilis Grateloup, 1834 †: synonym of Fissilabia mirabilis (Grateloup, 1834) † (original combination)
- Eburna molliana G. B. Sowerby II, 1859: synonym of Babylonia valentiana (Swainson, 1822)
- Eburna monilis Schumacher, 1817: synonym of Bullia vittata (Linnaeus, 1767)
- Eburna pacifica Swainson, 1822: synonym of Babylonia lutosa (Lamarck, 1816)
- Eburna papillaris G. B. Sowerby I, 1825: synonym of Zemiropsis papillaris (G. B. Sowerby I, 1825) (original combination)
- Eburna perforata G. B. Sowerby II, 1870: synonym of Babylonia perforata (G. B. Sowerby II, 1870) (original combination)
- Eburna semipicta G. B. Sowerby II, 1866: synonym of Babylonia spirata (Linnaeus, 1758)
- Eburna tessellata Swainson, 1823: synonym of Babylonia areolata (Link, 1807)
- Eburna troschelii Kobelt, 1881: synonym of Babylonia lutosa (Lamarck, 1816)
- Eburna valentiana Swainson, 1822: synonym of Babylonia valentiana (Swainson, 1822) (original combination)
