= Babylonia perforata =

Scientific classification
- Kingdom: Animalia
- Phylum: Mollusca
- Class: Gastropoda
- Subclass: Caenogastropoda
- Order: Neogastropoda
- Family: Babyloniidae
- Genus: Babylonia
- Species: B. perforata

Binomial name
- Babylonia perforata (G.B. Sowerby II, 1870)

Synonyms
- Eburna perforata G.B. Sowerby II, 1870

Species of gastropod

Babylonia perforata is a species of sea snail, a marine gastropod mollusc in the family Babyloniidae. It has been named after Italian journalist Piero Angela.

== Subspecies ==
- Babylonia perforata perforata (G.B. Sowerby II, 1870) : synonyms = Eburna perforata G.B. Sowerby II, 1870
- Babylonia perforata pieroangelai Cossigniani, 2008 : synonyms = Babylonia pieroangelai Cossignani, 2008
