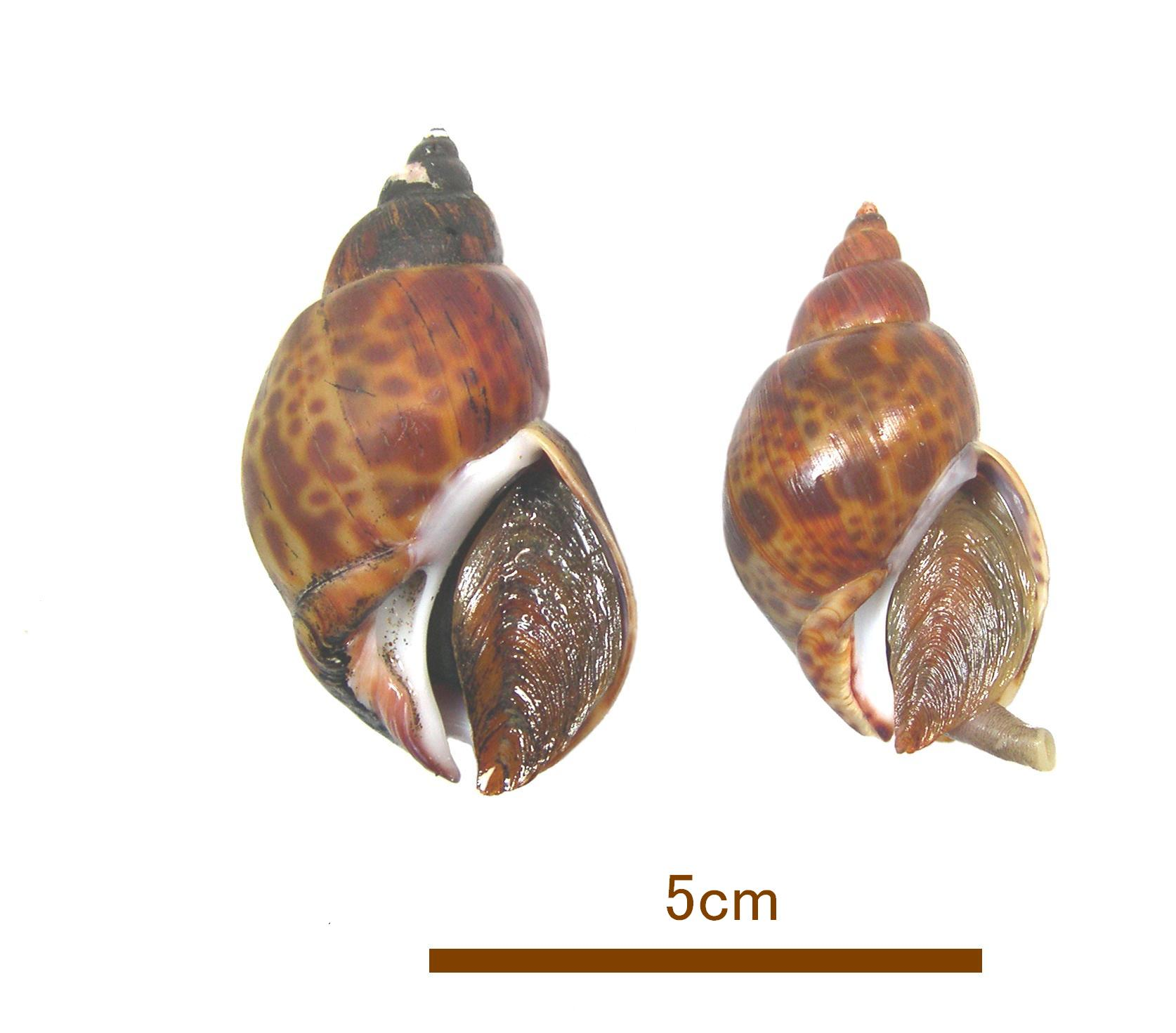
- Two live but retracted individuals of Babylonia japonica

Scientific classification
- Kingdom: Animalia
- Phylum: Mollusca
- Class: Gastropoda
- Subclass: Caenogastropoda
- Order: Neogastropoda
- Family: Babyloniidae
- Genus: Babylonia
- Species: B. japonica

Binomial name
- Babylonia japonica (Reeve, 1842)

Synonyms
- Eburna japonica Reeve, 1842 (original combination)

= Babylonia japonica =

Species of gastropod

Babylonia japonica, common name the Japanese Babylon or Japanese ivory shell, is a species of sea snail, a marine gastropod mollusc in the family Babyloniidae.

== Distribution ==
This marine species occurs off Korea, Japan and Taiwan.

== Description ==
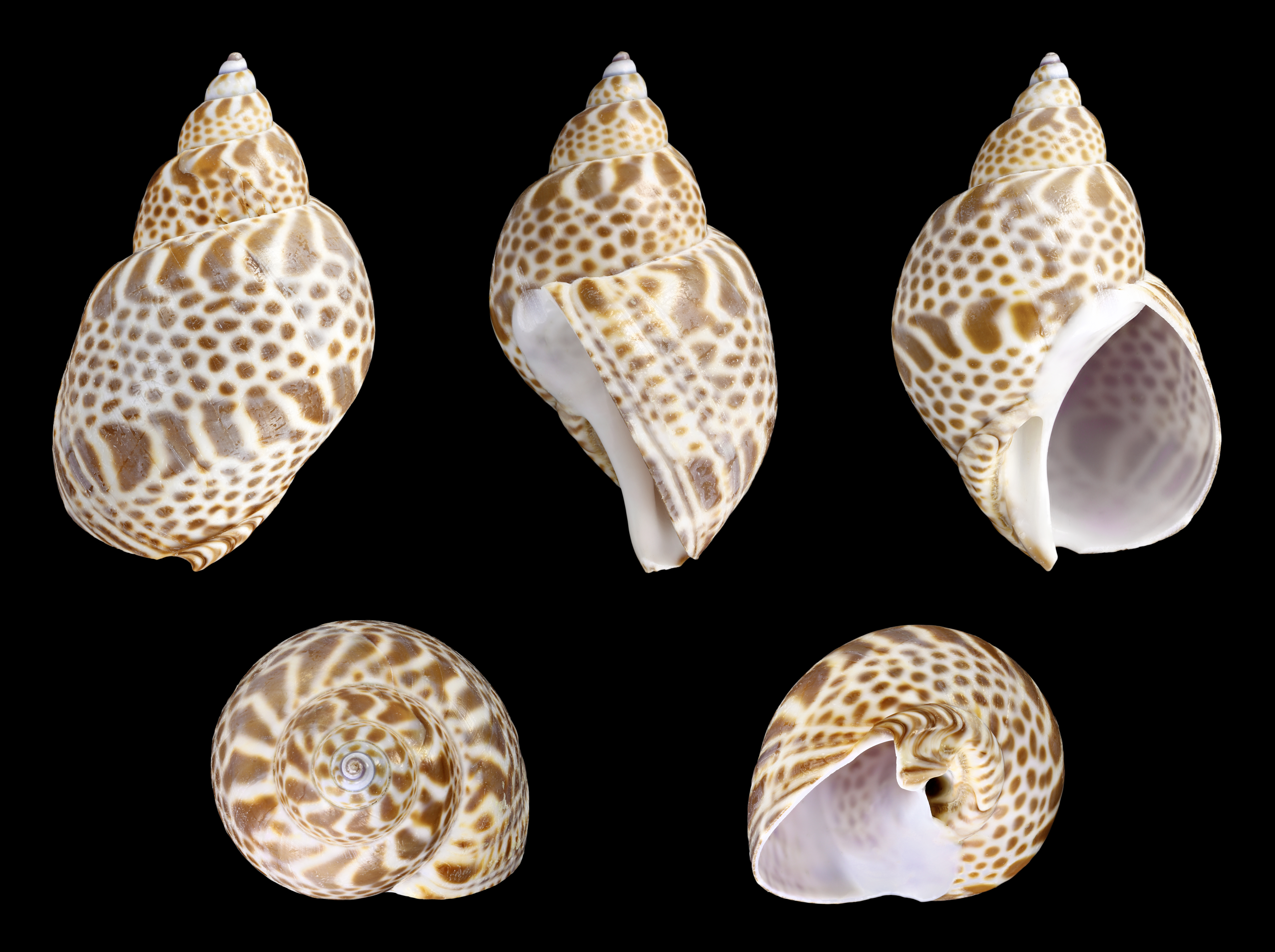
Babylonia japonica shell.

The length of the shell varies between 40 mm and 85 mm.

The ground color of the shell is white. The outer whorl has two rows of brown blotches among rows of fine spots. The pattern is similar to that of Babylonia zeylanica and B. spirata, but B. japonica has smaller and more numerous spots.

In life, this shell is covered by a brown or tan periostracum.

== Human use ==
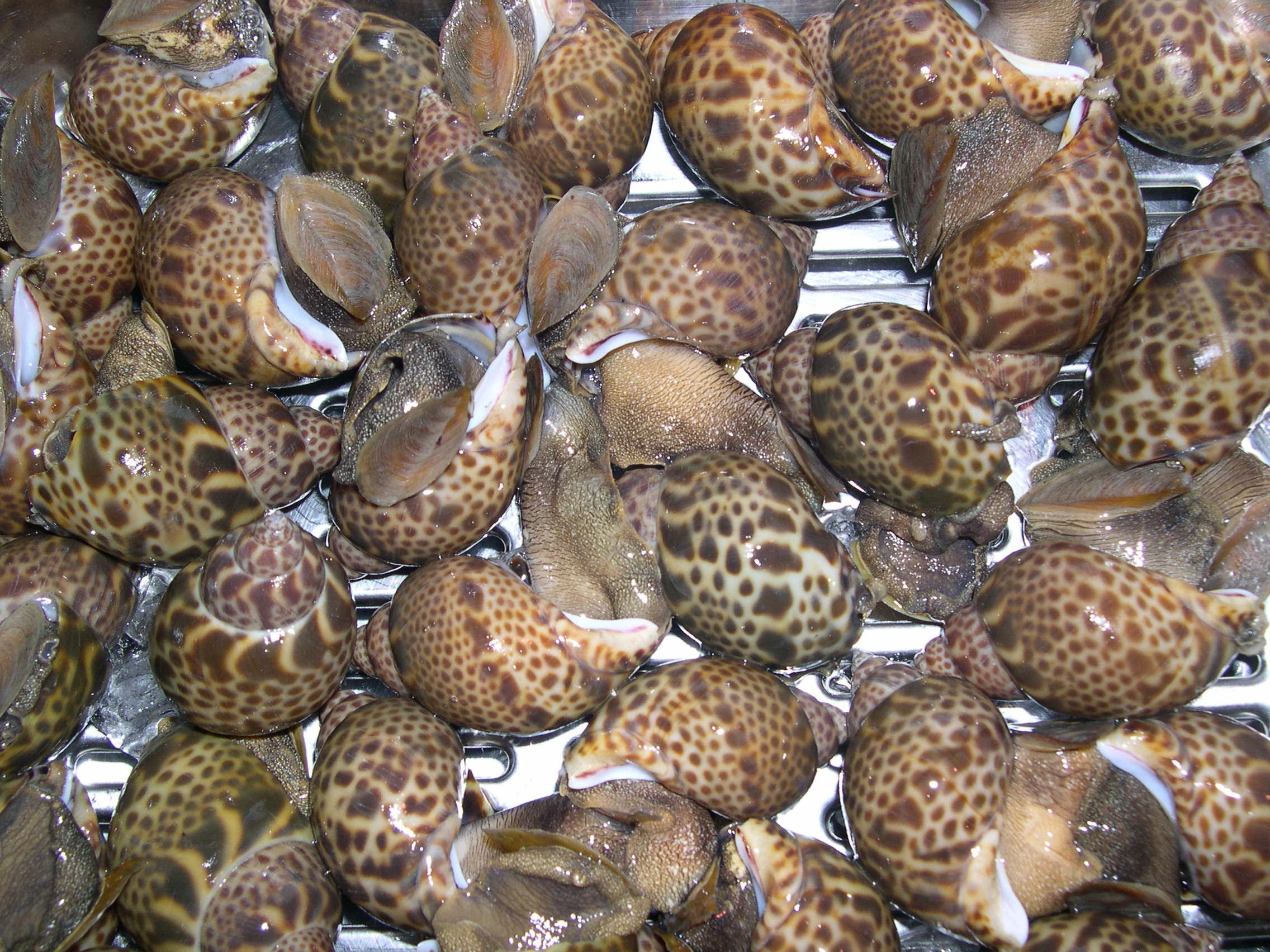
Babylonia japonica for sale at a fishmarket in Japan.

Although this species is generally considered edible for humans, it is known to bioaccumulate toxins under certain conditions, namely the surugatoxin family, which causes blockage of autonomic ganglia, and tetrodotoxin (pufferfish toxin). In September 1965 a food poisoning outbreak occurred after ingestion of this species from Suruga Bay. The symptoms largely corresponded to ganglionic blockage, with parasympathetic dysfunction being more common than sympathetic dysfunction.
