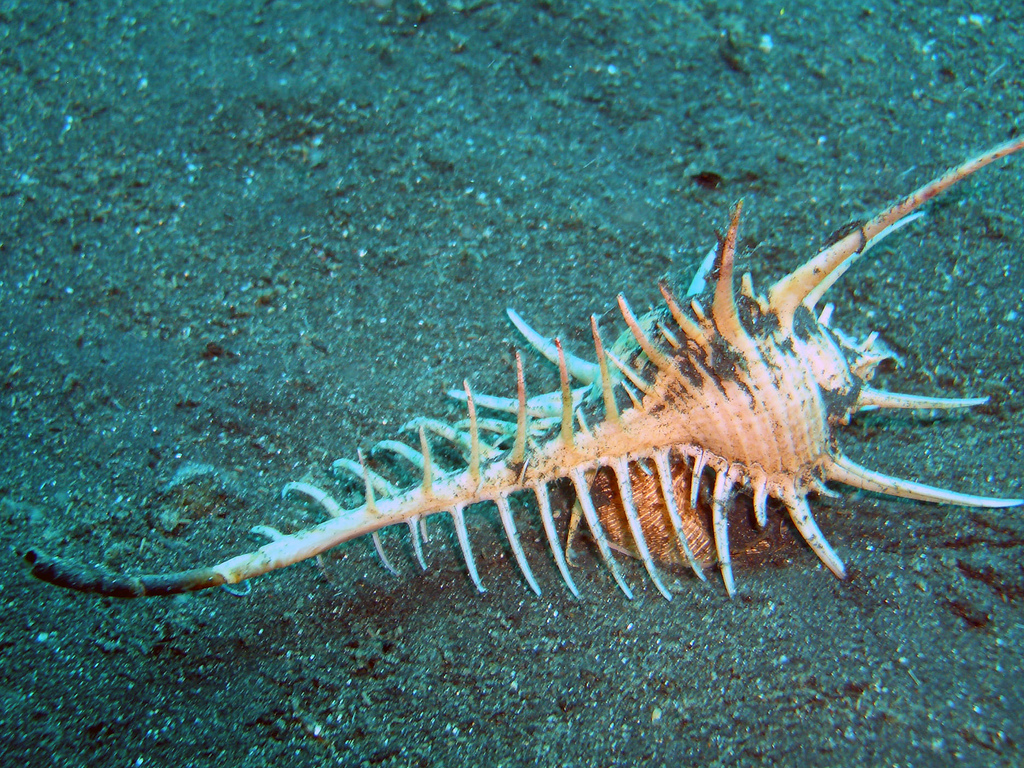
- Murex pecten

Scientific classification
- Kingdom: Animalia
- Phylum: Mollusca
- Class: Gastropoda
- Subclass: Caenogastropoda
- Order: Neogastropoda
- Superfamily: Muricoidea; Rafinesque, 1815

Families
- See text

Synonyms
- Muricacea (suffix -oidea mandatory for a superfamily name following current ICZN art. 29.2.)

= Muricoidea =

Muricoidea Temporal range: Cretaceous to Recent

Superfamily of sea snails

Muricoidea is a taxonomic superfamily of predatory sea snails, marine gastropod mollusks in the clade Neogastropoda.

This superfamily includes the murex snails, the dove snails, the harp snails, and others.

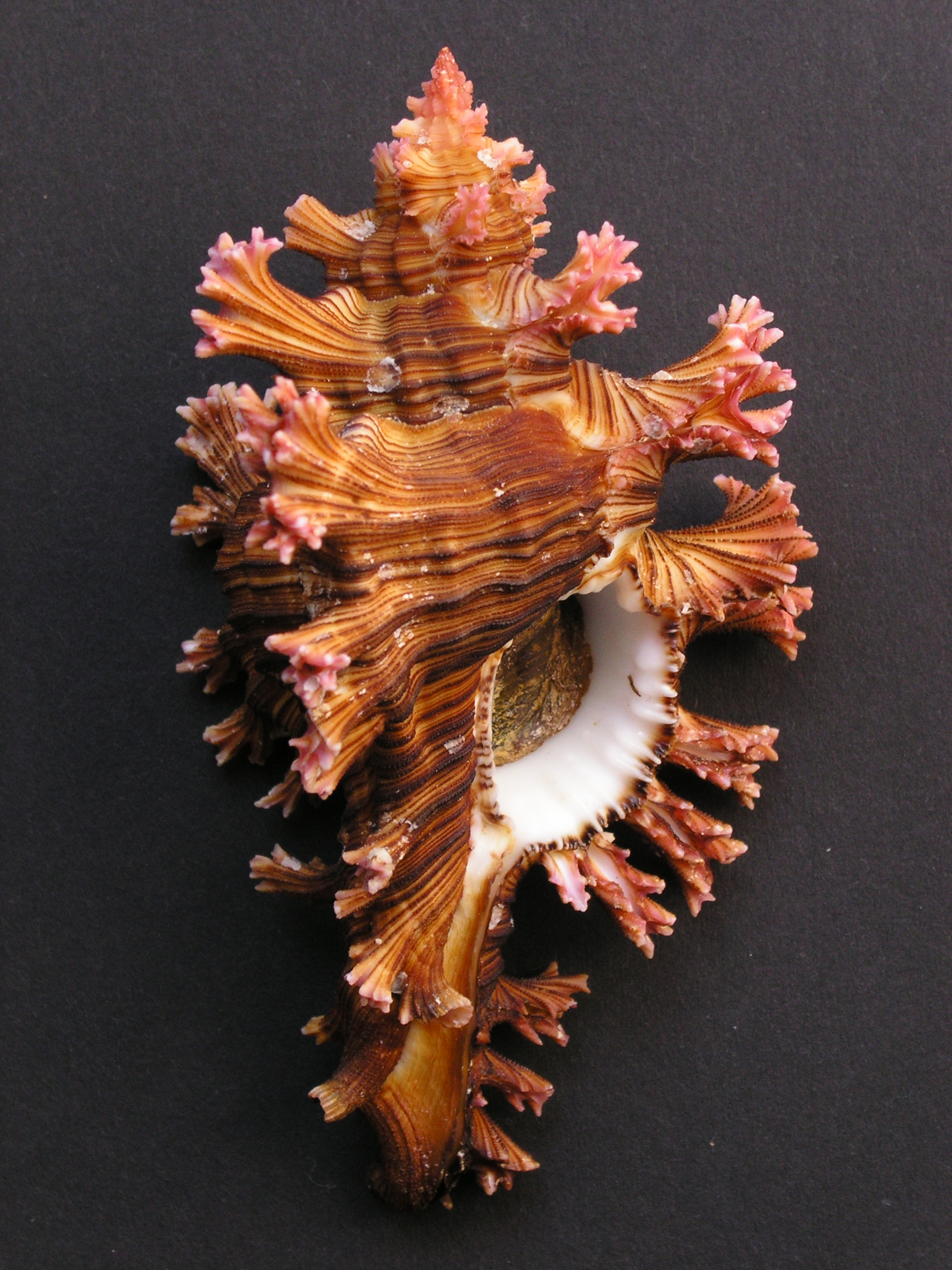
Apertural view of a shell of Chicoreus palmarosae with the operculum positioned in place

== Shell description ==
The shell of the snails in this superfamily vary greatly in shape and degree of ornamentation. The shells have an oval aperture, and a noticeable siphonal canal.

== Families ==
Families within the superfamily Muricoidea are as follows:

- family Babyloniidae Kuroda, Habe & Oyama, 1971 -- 2 current genera
- family Costellariidae MacDonald, 1860 -- 11 genera
- family Harpidae Bronn, 1849 -- 4 genera
- family Muricidae Rafinesque, 1815 -- 159 genera
- family Pholidotomidae Cossmann, 1896 †
- family Pleioptygmatidae Quinn, 1989 -- 1 genus
- family Strepsiduridae Cossmann, 1901 -- 1 genus
- family Turbinellidae Swainson, 1835 -- 14 genera
- family Volutomitridae Gray, 1854 -- 7 genera

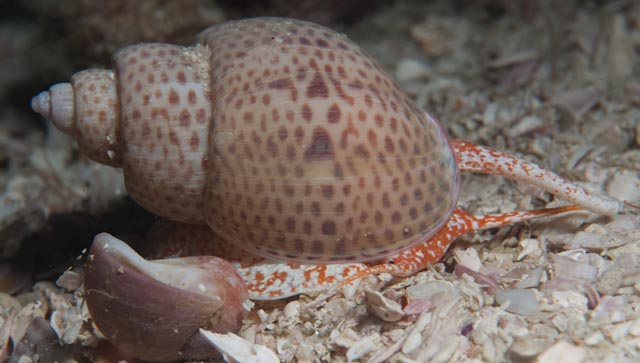
Zemiropsis papillaris, Babyloniidae

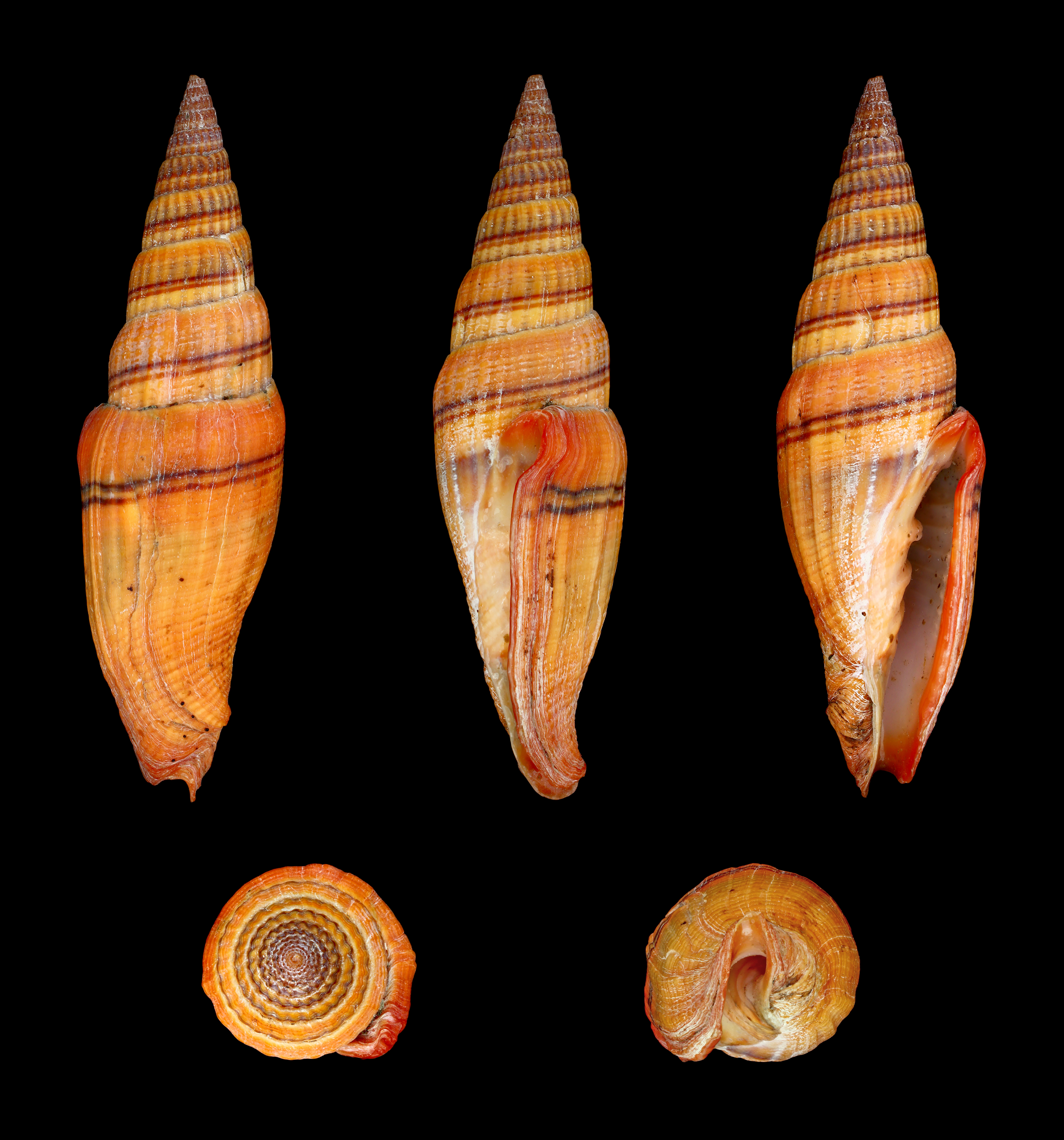
Vexillum ornatum, Costellariidae
