= Babylonia umbilifusca =

Scientific classification
- Kingdom: Animalia
- Phylum: Mollusca
- Class: Gastropoda
- Subclass: Caenogastropoda
- Order: Neogastropoda
- Family: Babyloniidae
- Genus: Babylonia
- Species: B. umbilifusca

Binomial name
- Babylonia umbilifusca E. Gittenberger & Goud, 2003

Species of gastropod

Babylonia umbilifusca is a species of sea snail, a marine gastropod mollusc in the family Babyloniidae.
