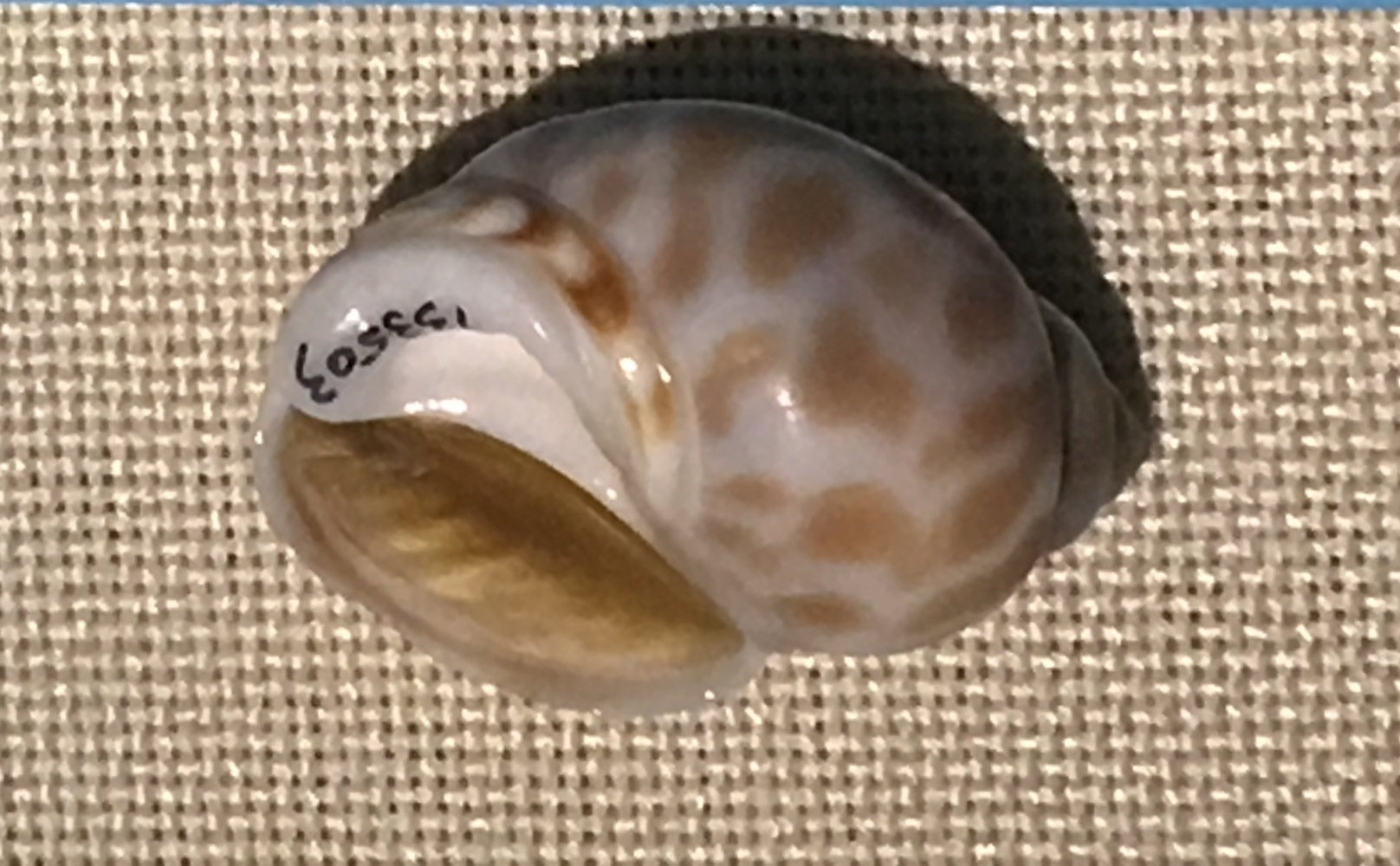

Scientific classification
- Kingdom: Animalia
- Phylum: Mollusca
- Class: Gastropoda
- Subclass: Caenogastropoda
- Order: Neogastropoda
- Family: Babyloniidae
- Genus: Babylonia
- Species: B. feicheni

Binomial name
- Babylonia feicheni Shikama, 1973

= Babylonia feicheni =

Species of gastropod

Babylonia feicheni is a species of sea snail, a marine gastropod mollusk, in the family Babyloniidae. The average length is 55.7 millimetres.
