= Babylonia borneensis =

Scientific classification
- Kingdom: Animalia
- Phylum: Mollusca
- Class: Gastropoda
- Subclass: Caenogastropoda
- Order: Neogastropoda
- Family: Babyloniidae
- Genus: Babylonia
- Species: B. borneensis

Binomial name
- Babylonia borneensis (G. B. Sowerby II, 1864)

Synonyms
- Eburna borneensis G. B. Sowerby II, 1864

Species of gastropod

Babylonia borneensis is a species of sea snail, a marine gastropod mollusk, in the family Babyloniidae.
