= Babylonia leonis =

Scientific classification
- Kingdom: Animalia
- Phylum: Mollusca
- Class: Gastropoda
- Subclass: Caenogastropoda
- Order: Neogastropoda
- Family: Babyloniidae
- Genus: Babylonia
- Species: †B. leonis

Binomial name
- †Babylonia leonis van Regteren Altena & Gittenberger, 1972

Extinct species of gastropod

Babylonia leonis is an extinct species of sea snail, a marine gastropod mollusk, in the family Babyloniidae.
