= Alberto Angela =

Italian science communicator

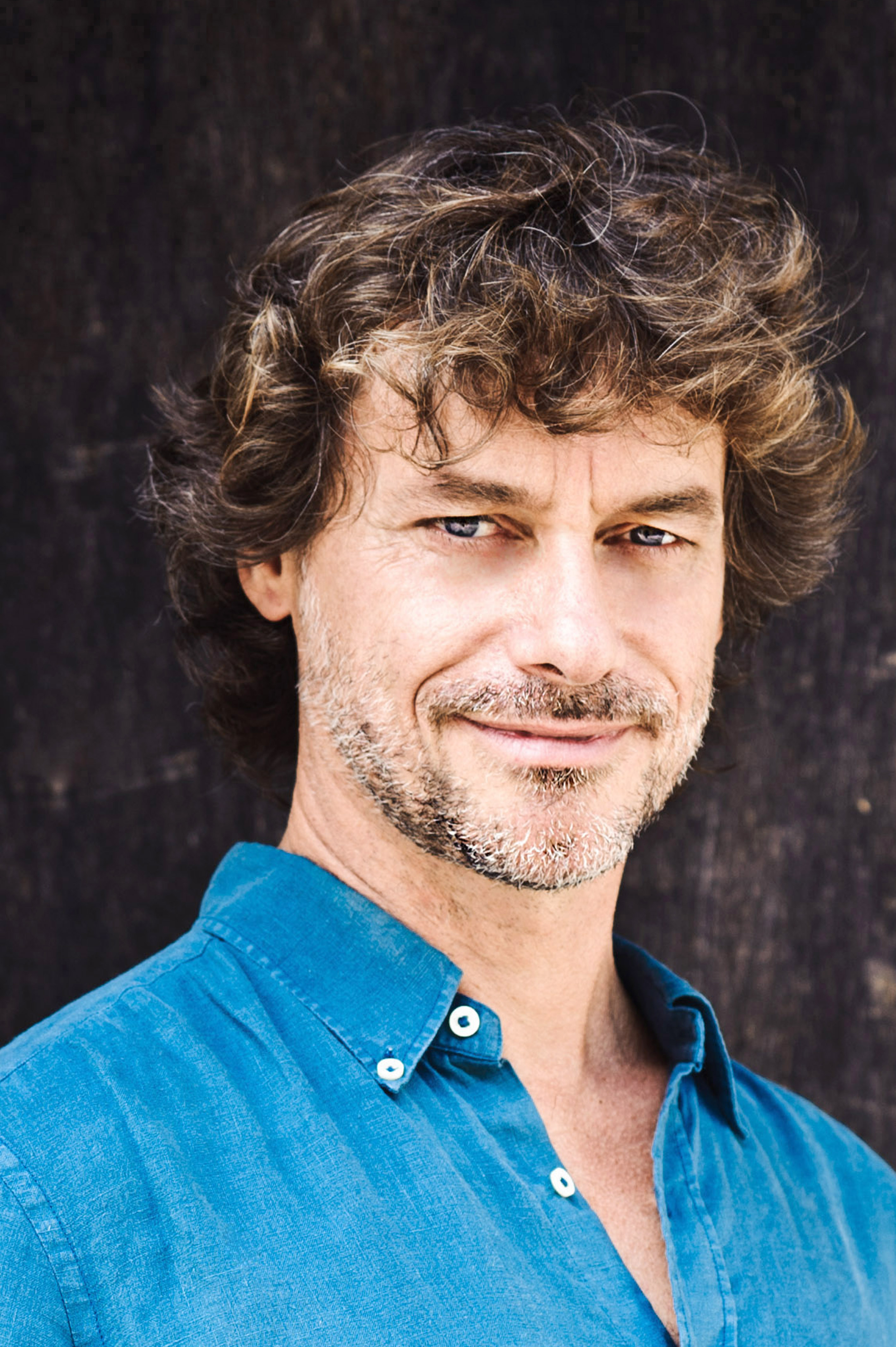
- Angela in 2013
- Born: Alberto Cesare Angela; 8 April 1962 (age 64); Paris, France
- Education: La Sapienza University
- Occupations: Paleontologist; television host; journalist; writer
- Years active: 1990–present
- Height: 1.73 m (5 ft 8 in)
- Spouse: Monica Angela (m. 1993)
- Children: 3
- Parent(s): Piero Angela; Margherita Pastore

Signature
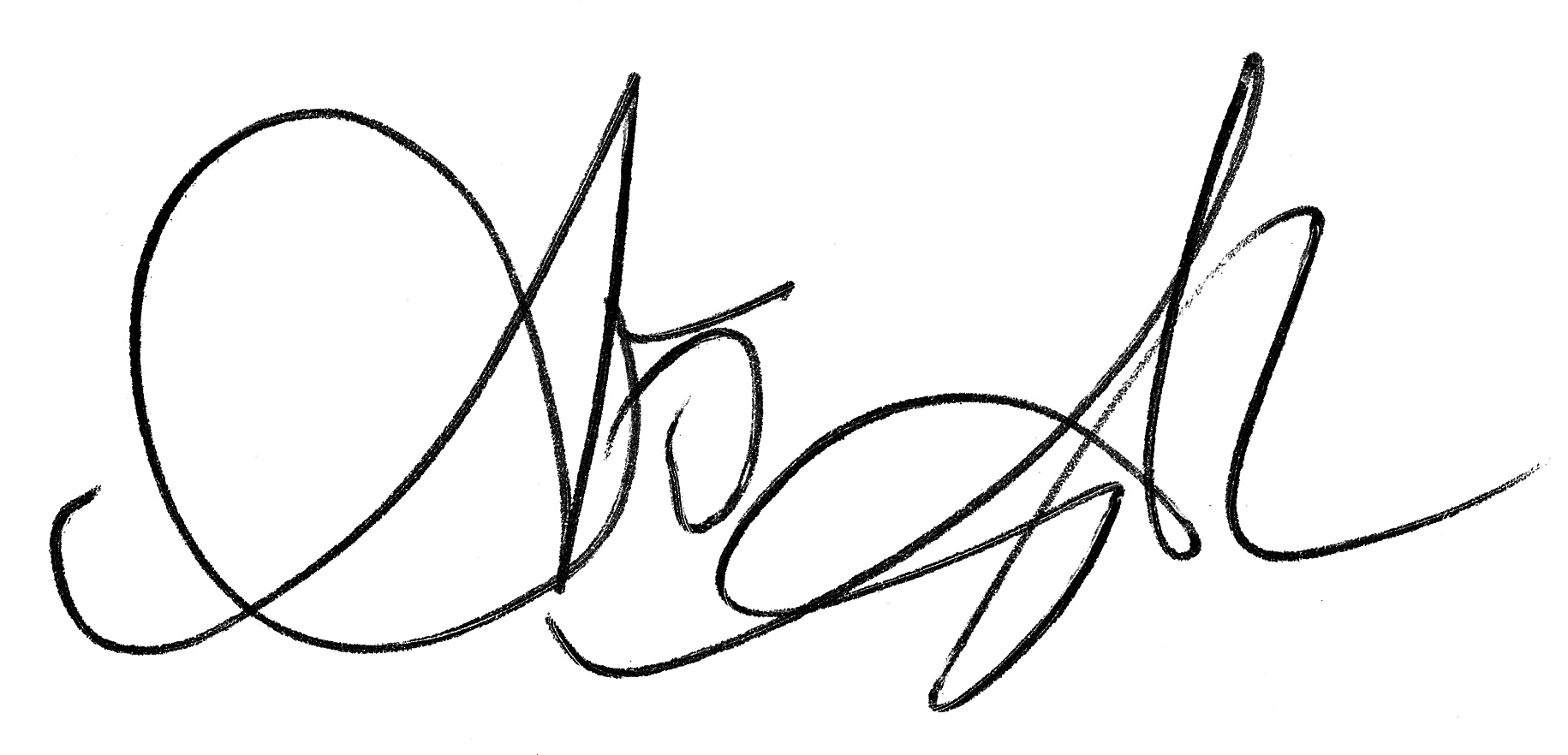

Alberto Cesare Angela (Italian: [alˈbɛrto ˈandʒela]; born 8 April 1962) is an Italian paleontologist, television host, journalist, and writer. Angela is a well known history and science communicator in Italy.

== Biography ==
Angela was born in Paris, France, where his father worked as correspondent for RAI. He accompanied his father, Italian TV announcer Piero Angela, on his trips when he was a child, something that allowed him to learn many European languages and to acquire a cosmopolitan culture. After being a student in France and studying at the Lycée français Chateaubriand of Rome, he enrolled in a course of Natural Sciences at the Sapienza University of Rome, graduating with 110/110 and a prize for his thesis. He also studied at several American universities, where he took courses of specialisation from Harvard, Columbia, and UCLA and further focused on palaeontology and paleoanthropology. Once out of university he started working in the research field participating in paleoanthropologic digs in various places in the world, including Zaire, Ishango, Tanzania, Olduvai, Laetoli, Oman, Mongolia, and the Gobi Desert.

In 1988 he published an essay on the new techniques of interactivity in scientific museums, entitled Musei (e mostre) a misura d'uomo. Come comunicare attraverso gli oggetti. Together with his father he has written various books of scientific subjects: La straordinaria storia dell'uomo (1989), La straordinaria storia della vita sulla Terra (1992), Il Pianeta dei Dinosauri (1993), Dentro al Mediterraneo (1995), La straordinaria storia di una vita che nasce - 9 mesi nel ventre materno (1996), Squali (1997), and Viaggio nel Cosmo (1998).

As a journalist, he has collaborated with various daily papers and periodicals, including La Stampa, Airone, and Epoca.

On television programs, he has conceived and written together with his father Il pianeta dei dinosauri, transmitted by Rai 1 in 1993; he is one of the authors of a series of TV program(s), including Superquark, Quark speciale, and Viaggio nel cosmo for Rai 1. He is also author of the afternoon documentary container-program Passaggio a Nord Ovest, on the same channel. In 1998 he was a commentator in the field in the Italian version of the series of documentaries "Big Cat Diary" devoted to the great African feline, entirely realized in co-production between RAI and the BBC and for this program, he stayed in the reserve of Masai Mara, in Narok County, Kenya. Together with his father, Angela was the host of the program Ulisse, from 2001 on Rai 3, for which he won the Premio Flaiano for television. In 2002 he was attacked and robbed by bandits while filming a TV program, in the desert of Niger.

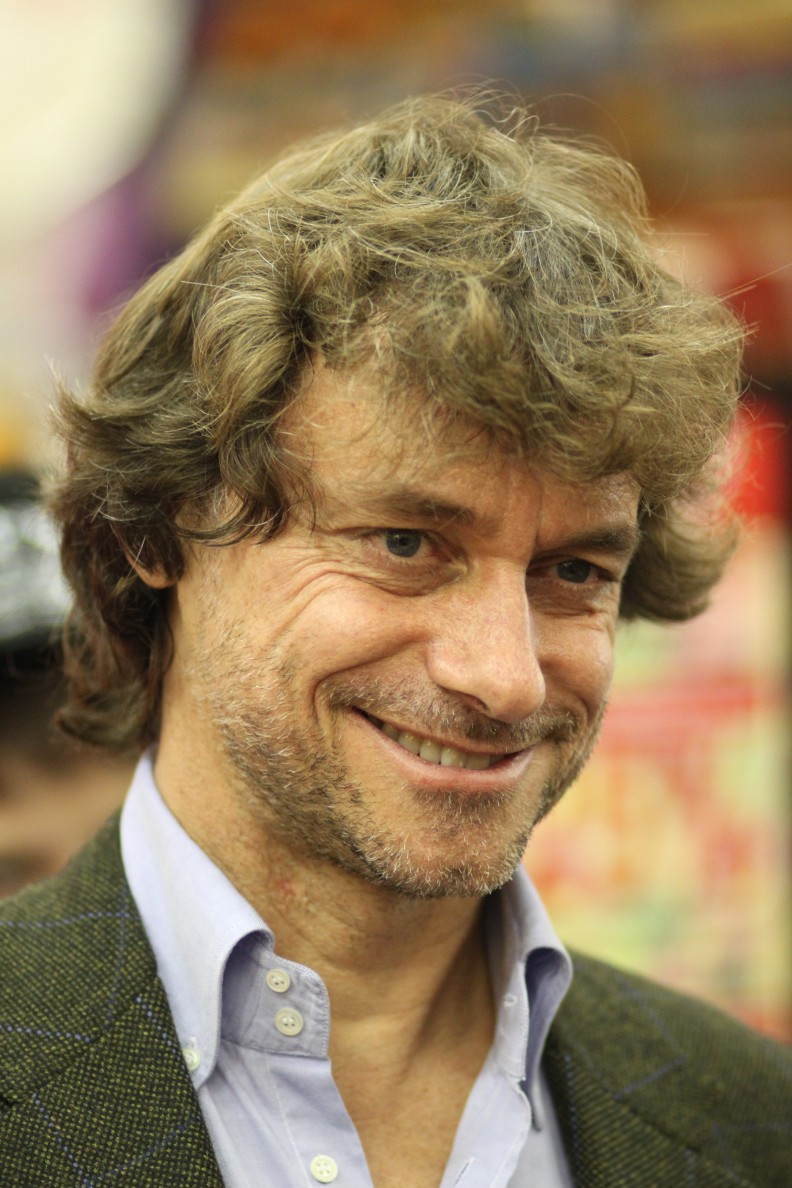
Angela in 2010

He received the America Award (Premio America) of the Italy-USA Foundation in 2017.

In 2018, he received honorary Neapolitan citizenship.

Angela is a member of the Italian Institute of Human Palaeontology (Rome) and of the Centro Studi Ricerche Ligabue (Venice).

== Works ==
- Piero Angela, Alberto Angela, The extraordinary story of human origins, Prometheus Books, 1993. ISBN 978-0-87975-803-5.
- Piero Angela, Alberto Angela, The extraordinary story of life on earth, Prometheus Books, 1996. ISBN 978-1-57392-043-8.
- Piero Angela, Alberto Angela, Sharks!: predators of the sea, photographs by Alberto Luca Recchi, Courage Books, 1998.
- Alberto Angela, A Day in the Life of Ancient Rome, translated by Gregory Conti, Europa Editions, Incorporated, 2009. ISBN 978-1-933372-71-6.
- Alberto Angela, The Reach of Rome, translated by Gregory Conti, Rizzoli Ex Libris, 2013, New York. ISBN 978-0-8478-4128-8.
