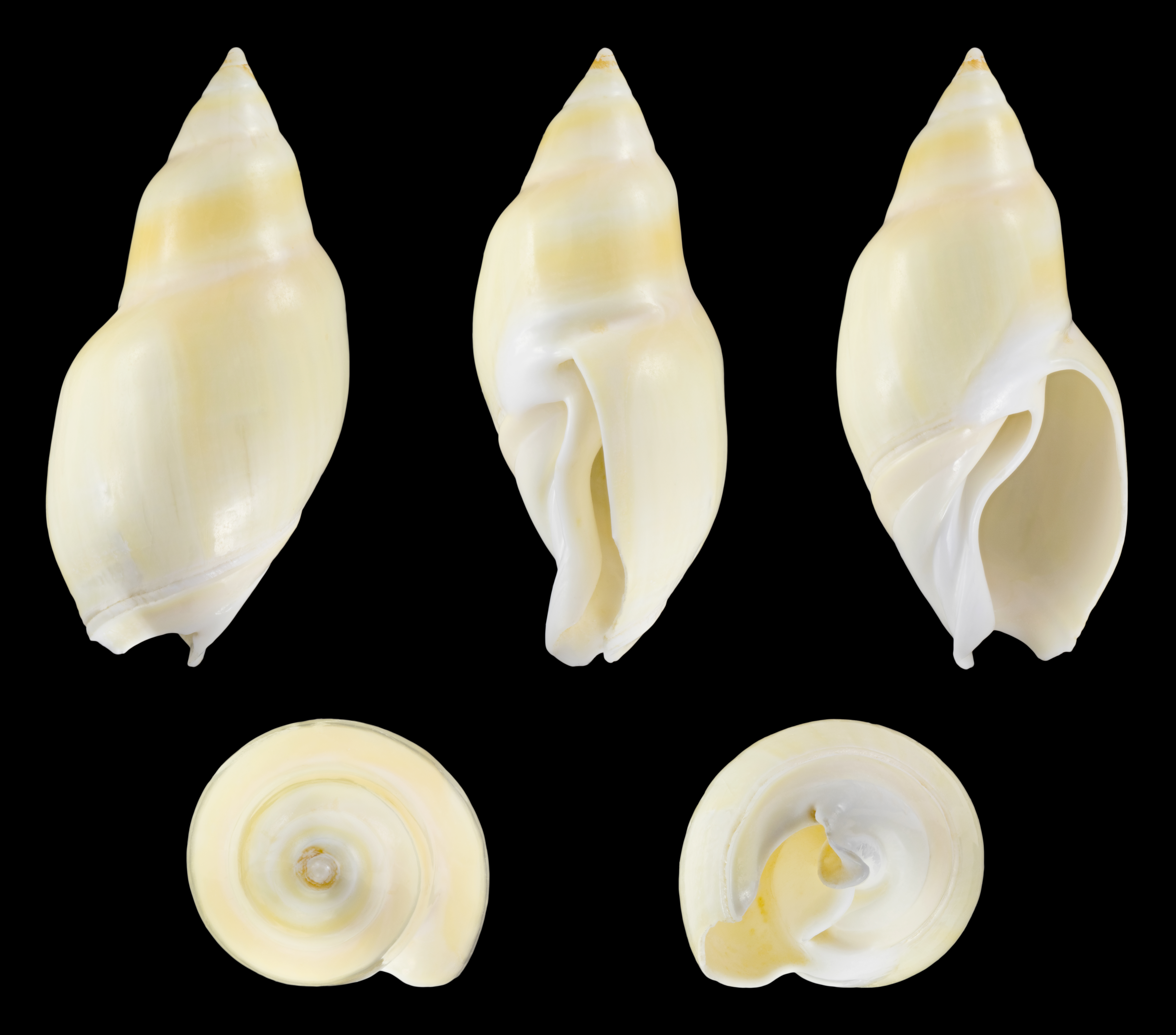

Scientific classification
- Kingdom: Animalia
- Phylum: Mollusca
- Class: Gastropoda
- Subclass: Caenogastropoda
- Order: Neogastropoda
- Family: Ancillariidae
- Genus: Eburna
- Species: E. glabrata

Binomial name
- Eburna glabrata (Linnaeus, 1758)

= Eburna glabrata =

Species of gastropod

Eburna glabrata is a species of sea snail, a marine gastropod mollusc in the family Ancillariidae, the olives.

== Description ==
An operculated species. Living mollusc is black in color.

== Distribution ==
Sometimes trawled by shrimpers at 60 m., in muddy sand. Venezuela, North coast of South America.
