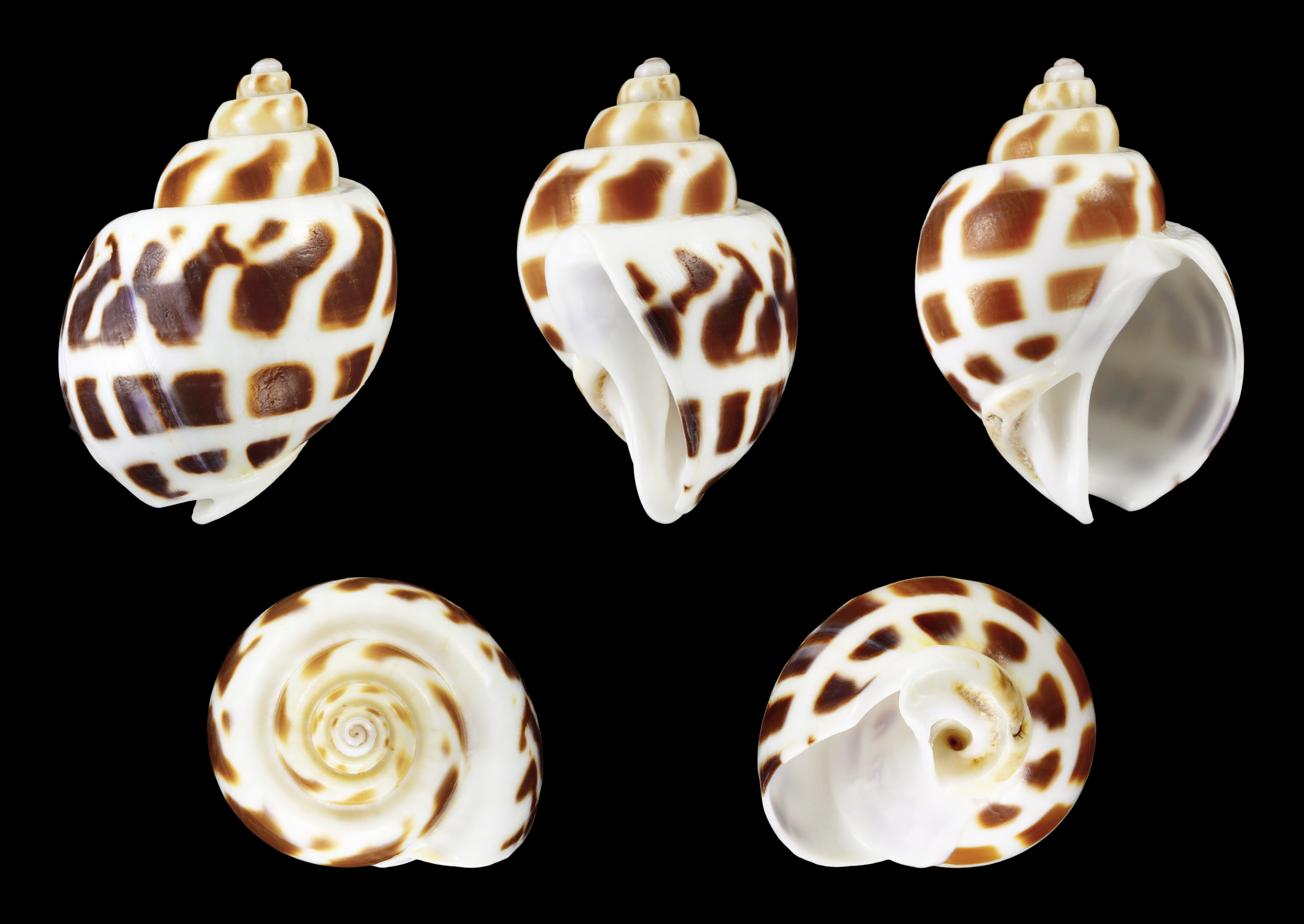
- Five views of a shell of Babylonia areolata

Scientific classification
- Kingdom: Animalia
- Phylum: Mollusca
- Class: Gastropoda
- Subclass: Caenogastropoda
- Order: Neogastropoda
- Family: Babyloniidae
- Genus: Babylonia
- Species: B. areolata

Binomial name
- Babylonia areolata (Link, 1807)

Synonyms
- Babylonia areolata f. austraoceanensis Lan, 1997; Babylonia lani Gittenberger & Goud, 2003; Babylonia magnifica Fraussen & Stratmann, 2005; Babylonia tessellata (Swainson, 1823); Buccinum areolatum Link, 1807 (original combination); Buccinum maculosum Röding, 1798 (Invalid: junior homonym of Buccinum maculosum Martyn, 1784); Eburna chemnitziana Fischer von Waldheim, 1807; Eburna tessellata Swainson, 1823

= Babylonia areolata =

Species of gastropod

Babylonia areolata is a species of sea snail, a marine gastropod mollusc in the family Babyloniidae.

== Description ==
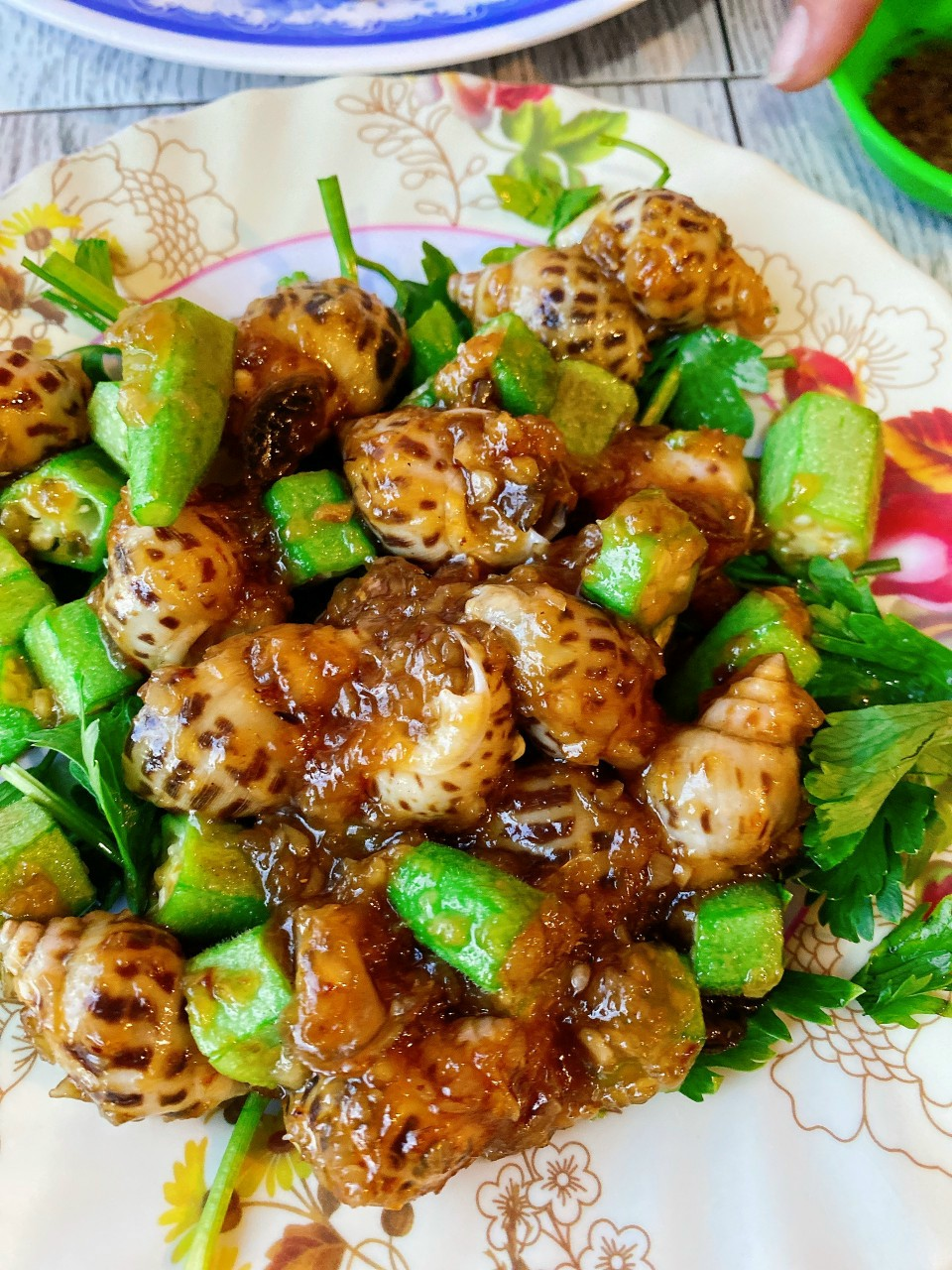
Fragrant snails with tamarind is a delicacy in Vietnam

Brown sections over a white shell.

== Distribution ==
This marine species occurs from off Taiwan to the Indian Ocean.
