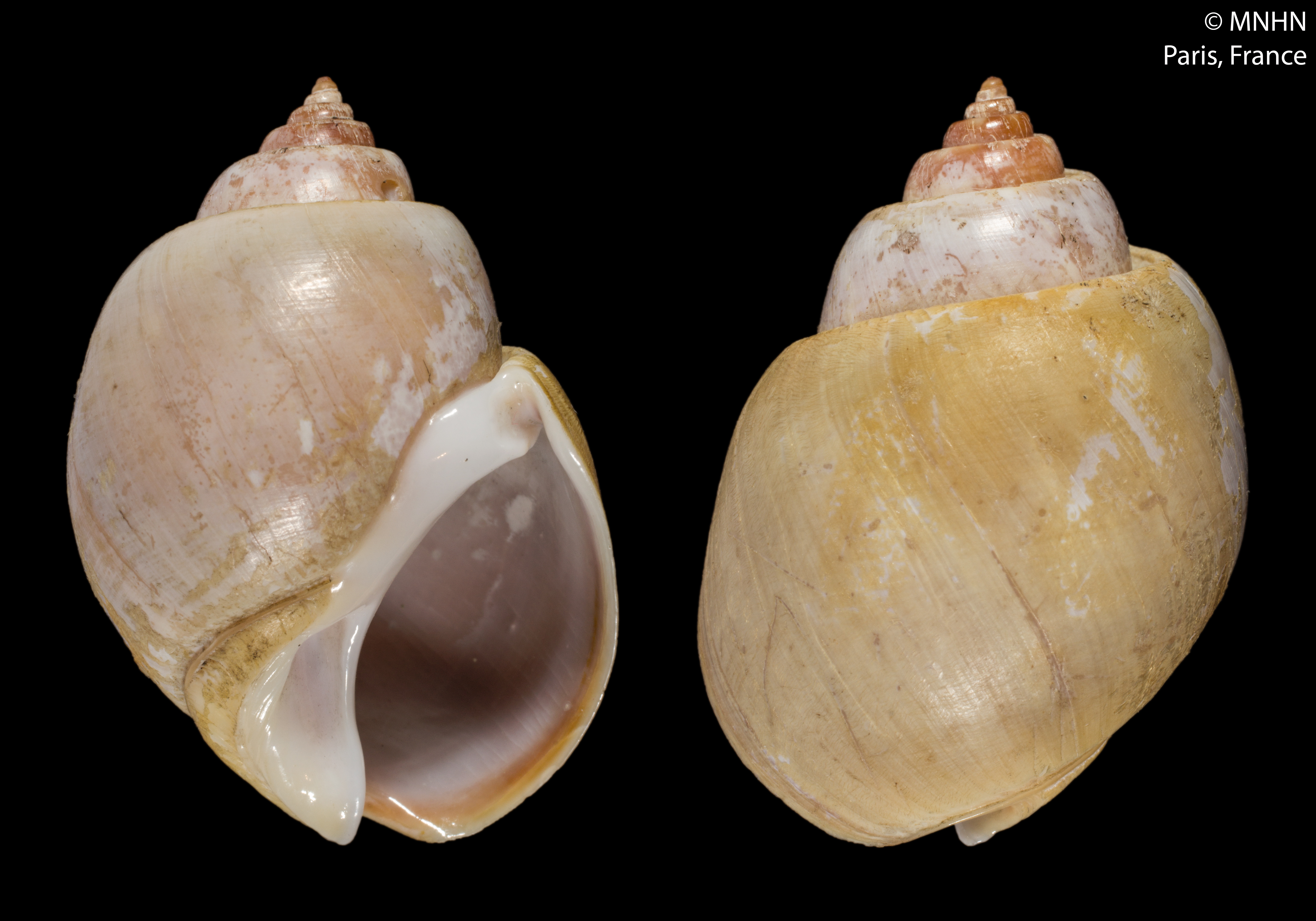
- Shell of Babylonia ambulacrum (holotype at MNHN, Paris)

Scientific classification
- Kingdom: Animalia
- Phylum: Mollusca
- Class: Gastropoda
- Subclass: Caenogastropoda
- Order: Neogastropoda
- Family: Babyloniidae
- Genus: Babylonia
- Species: B. ambulacrum

Binomial name
- Babylonia ambulacrum (G. B. Sowerby I, 1825)

Synonyms
- Eburna ambulacrum G. B. Sowerby I, 1825; Eburna immaculata Jousseaume, 1883

= Babylonia ambulacrum =

Species of gastropod

Babylonia ambulacrum is a species of sea snail, a marine gastropod mollusk, in the family Babyloniidae.
