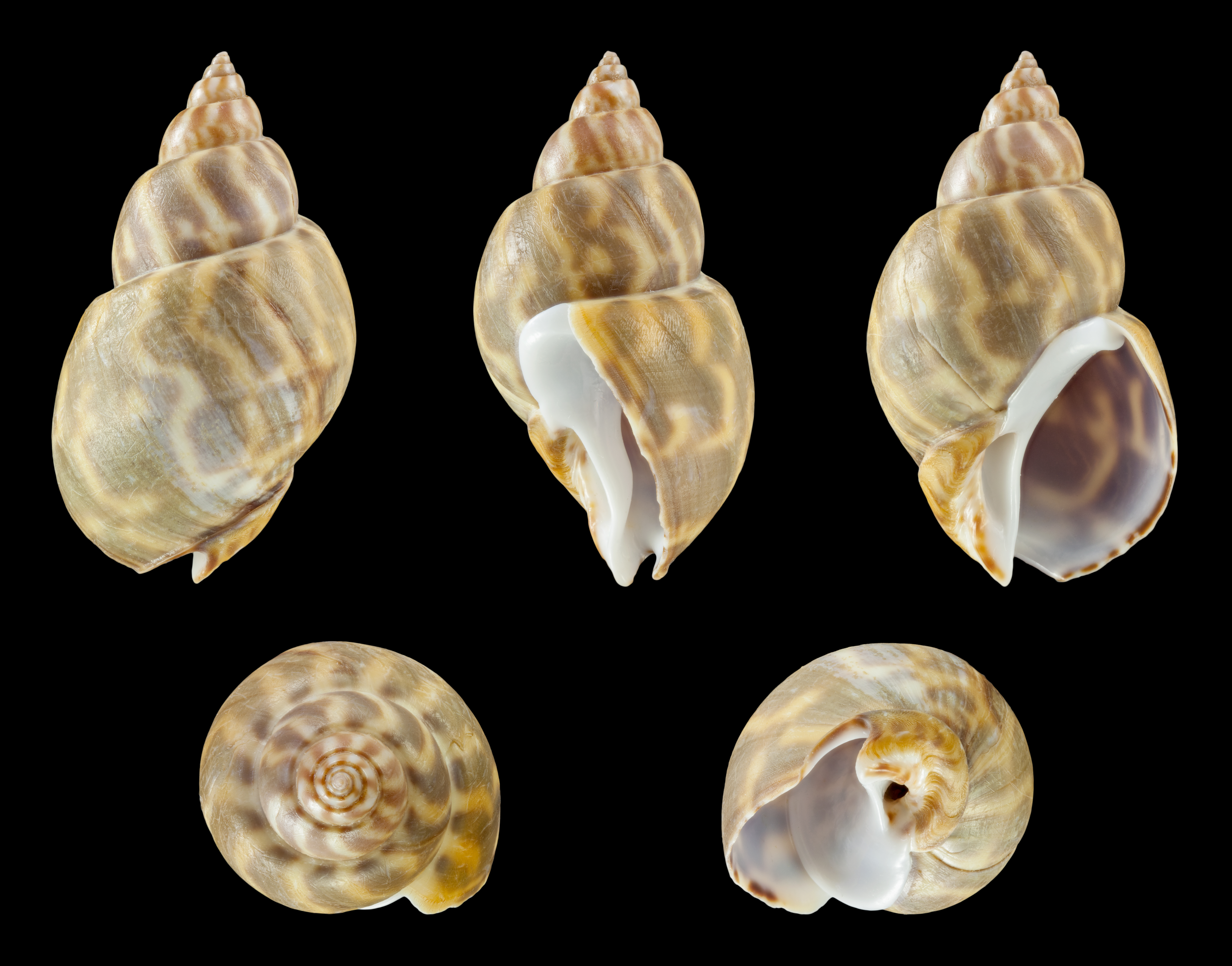

Scientific classification
- Kingdom: Animalia
- Phylum: Mollusca
- Class: Gastropoda
- Subclass: Caenogastropoda
- Order: Neogastropoda
- Family: Babyloniidae
- Genus: Babylonia
- Species: B. formosae

Binomial name
- Babylonia formosae (G. B. Sowerby II, 1866)

Synonyms
- Babylonia formosae formosae (G. B. Sowerby II, 1866); Eburna formosae G. B. Sowerby II, 1866

= Babylonia formosae =

Species of gastropod

Babylonia formosae is a species of sea snail, a marine gastropod mollusk, in the family Babyloniidae.
