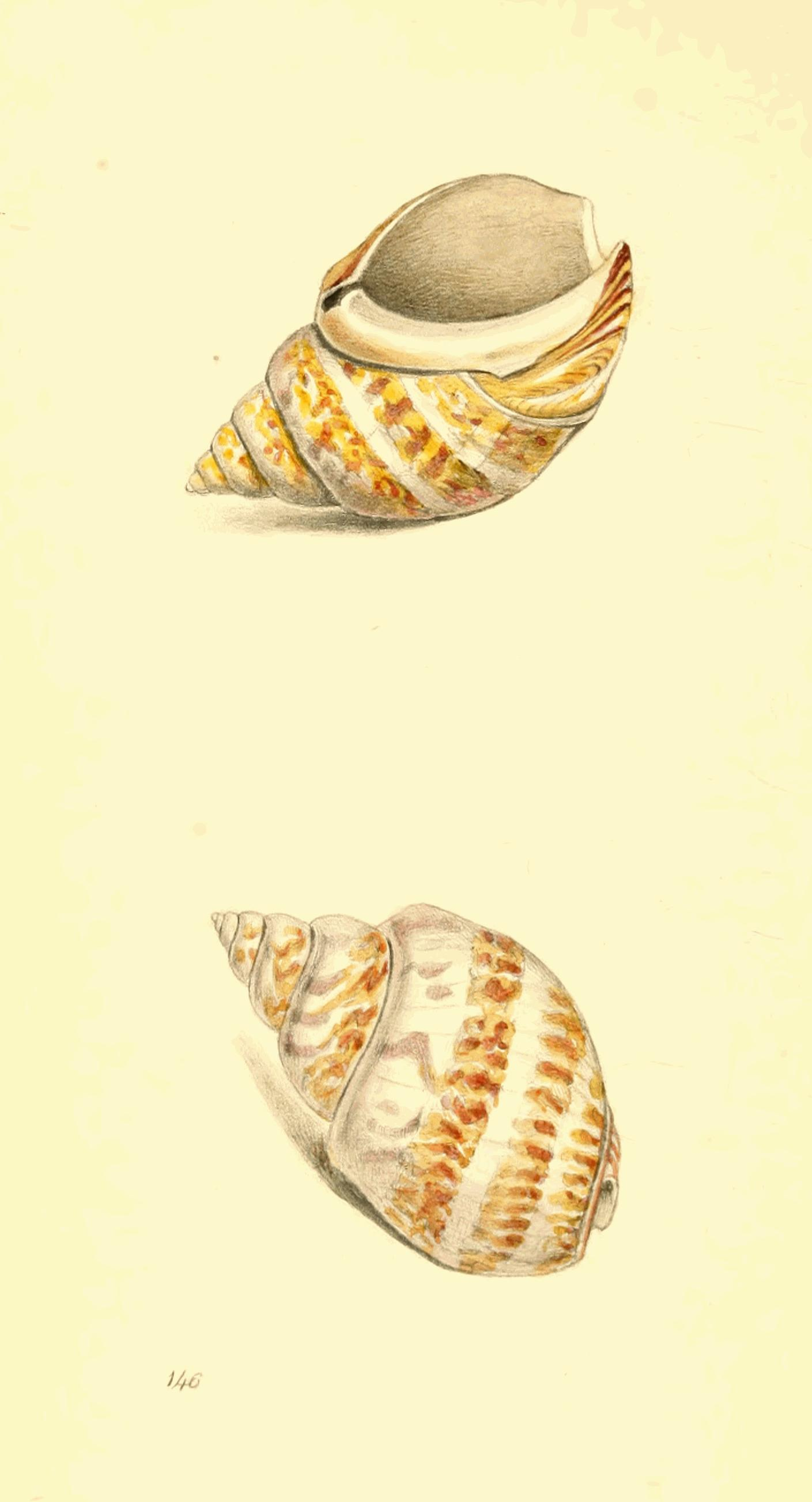

Scientific classification
- Kingdom: Animalia
- Phylum: Mollusca
- Class: Gastropoda
- Subclass: Caenogastropoda
- Order: Neogastropoda
- Family: Babyloniidae
- Genus: Babylonia
- Species: B. lutosa

Binomial name
- Babylonia lutosa (Lamarck, 1816)

Synonyms
- Eburna lutosa Lamarck, 1816; Eburna pacifica Swainson, 1822; Eburna troschelii Kobelt, 1881

= Babylonia lutosa =

Species of gastropod

Babylonia lutosa is a species of sea snail, a marine gastropod mollusk, in the family Babyloniidae.
