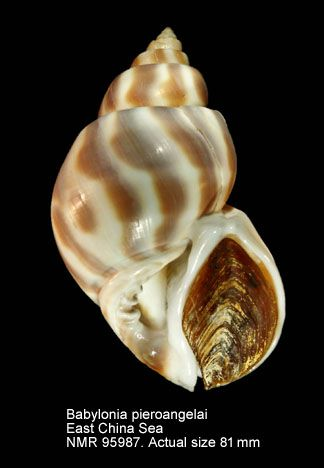

Scientific classification
- Kingdom: Animalia
- Phylum: Mollusca
- Class: Gastropoda
- Subclass: Caenogastropoda
- Order: Neogastropoda
- Family: Babyloniidae
- Genus: Babylonia
- Species: B. pieroangelai

Binomial name
- Babylonia pieroangelai Cossignani, 2008

= Babylonia pieroangelai =

Species of gastropod

Babylonia pieroangelai is a species of sea snail, a marine gastropod mollusk in the family Babyloniidae. It takes its name in honour of Piero Angela.
