= Eburna balteata =

- A shell of Eburna balteata

Scientific classification
- Kingdom: Animalia
- Phylum: Mollusca
- Class: Gastropoda
- Subclass: Caenogastropoda
- Order: Neogastropoda
- Family: Ancillariidae
- Genus: Eburna
- Species: E. balteata

Binomial name
- Eburna balteata (Swainson, 1825)

Species of gastropod

Eburna balteata is a species of sea snail, a marine gastropod mollusc in the family Ancillariidae.

== Description ==
This operculated species attains a size of about 24 mm.
