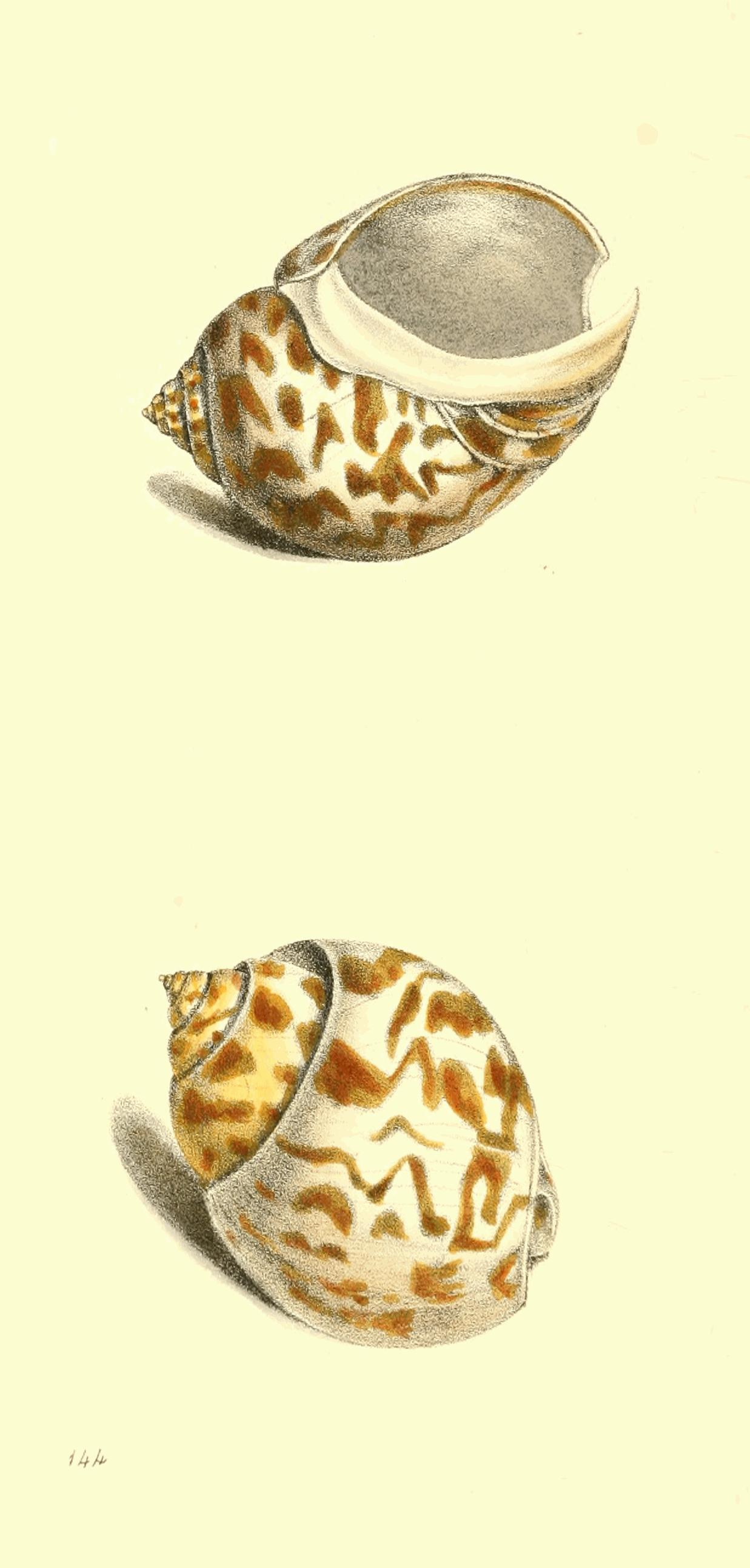
- Zoological Illustrations Volume III Plate 144

Scientific classification
- Kingdom: Animalia
- Phylum: Mollusca
- Class: Gastropoda
- Subclass: Caenogastropoda
- Order: Neogastropoda
- Family: Babyloniidae
- Genus: Babylonia
- Species: B. valentiana

Binomial name
- Babylonia valentiana (Swainson, 1822)

Synonyms
- Eburna molliana G. B. Sowerby II, 1859; Eburna valentiana Swainson, 1822

= Babylonia valentiana =

Species of gastropod

Babylonia valentiana is a species of sea snail, a marine gastropod mollusk, in the family Babyloniidae.

== Description ==
Shell size 65-70 mm. Trawled at 80-100 m. depth.

== Distribution ==
Indian Ocean: off the coast of Somalia.
