= Surugatoxin =

Chemical compound

Identifiers
- IUPAC name: [(3S)-2,3,4,5,6-pentahydroxycyclohexyl] (6aS,8R,9S,11aS)-6'-bromo-6a,9-dihydroxy-9-methyl-1,2',3,10-tetraoxo-spiro[4,6,7,11a-tetrahydropyrido[1,2-f]pteridine-8,3'-indoline]-7-carboxylate
- CAS Number: 40957-92-4
- PubChem CID: 3034617
- ChemSpider: 10472966
- UNII: TC4003XY6D
- CompTox Dashboard (EPA): DTXSID30961332

Chemical and physical data
- Formula: C_{25}H_{26}BrN_{5}O_{13}
- Molar mass: 684.409 g·mol^{−1}
- 3D model (JSmol): Interactive image
- SMILES: CC1(C(=O)N2C3=C(NCC2(C(C14C5=C(C=C(C=C5)Br)NC4=O)C(=O)OC6C(C(C(C(C6O)O)O)O)O)O)NC(=O)NC3=O)O

Surugatoxin (SGTX) is a type of venom found in the mid-gut digestive gland of the Japanese ivory mollusk Babylonia japonica, a carnivorous gastropod. It functions as a ganglionic blocker of nicotinic acetylcholine receptors (nAChRs). The structurally and functionally related neosurugatoxin, also derived from Babylonia japonica, is an even more potent nAChR antagonist than SGTX.

SGTX is a colorless crystalline substance with the chemical formula C_{25}H_{26}BrN_{5}O_{13} and a molecular weight of 684.4g/mol. Its systematic chemical name is [(2R,3S,5S,6S)-2,3,4,5,6-pentahydroxycyclohexyl] (6aS,7R,8R,9R)-6'-bromo-6a,9-dihydroxy-9-methyl-1,2',3,10-tetraoxo-spiro[4,5,6,7-tetrahydropyrido[1,2-f]pteridine-8,3'-indoline]-7-carboxylate. It is insoluble in organic solvents and has very low solubility in water.

The ganglionic blockade of nAChRs by SGTX is similar to that of IS-toxin, a structurally similar compound derived from the same mollusk, Babylonia japonica.

== Background and discovery ==
A food poisoning outbreak of 26 cases in the Ganyudo area of Suruga Bay, Shizuoka Prefecture in Japan in September 1965 was traced to ingestion of the toxin surugatoxin (SGTX), named for Suruga Bay. SGTX is contained in the mid-gut digestive gland of the Japanese ivory mollusk, Babylonia japonica, which is used as an ingredient in sushi and sashimi. The food-poisoning patients reported a variety of symptoms, including visual disorders, speech disorders, lazy eye amblyopia, pupil dilation (mydriasis), abdominal distention, dry mouth, numbness of lips, constipation, and vomiting.

The toxicity shellfish from the Suruga Bay area varied with time – the toxicity was only present during July through September, when temperatures sometimes reached 25°C and it rapidly declined after 1978, making the availability of surugatoxin and the related substances neosurugatoxin and prosurugatoxin unavailable for research. Kosuge and colleagues found that these toxins are actually the metabolized products of a marine bacterium that belongs to the Coryneform group. Toxicity is a result of bioaccumulation.

== Behavioral and physiological effects ==
A number of researchers have characterized the effect of surugatoxin on behavior and physiology in animal models

=== Mice ===
SGTX causes disturbances in gait, suppression of spontaneous motility, and mydriasis in mice at intravenous (i.v.) dose levels of 0.5-1.0 mg/kg. At higher doses (20–40 mg/kg), intraperitoneal (i.p.) application of SGTX caused depression of respiratory movement and tremor.

=== Rats ===
SGTX blocks orthodromic transmission, as evidenced by the fact that the synaptic potential is strongly depressed with application of the toxin and the block intensifies as stimulus frequency increases. This effect is slow to develop and is similar to another ganglionic nACHR antagonist, hexamethonium.

=== Cats ===
SGTX causes depression of spontaneous movement, mydriasis, and relaxation of the nictitating membrane in cats at i.v. dose levels of 0.15-0.2 mg/kg. Further, it produces hypotension of 1–2 hours in duration that is not prevented by treatment with atropine or propranolol.

=== Humans ===
Most clinical symptoms resulting from Babylonia japonica ingestion, as in the 1965 food-poisoning outbreak, seem to be mediated by ganglion-blockade of nicotinic ACh receptors at various sites; visual impairments and mydriasis due to ciliary ganglion blockade, dry mouth due to submaxillary and otic ganglion blockade, and constipation and abdominal distention due to intestinal intrinsic nerve blockade.

== Pharmacology ==
Surugatoxin is a specific, reversible, competitive antagonist of ganglionic nicotinic acetylcholine receptors (nACHRs). Although a number of articles were published in the two decades following the discovery of SGTX in the mid-1960s, relatively little is known about the pharmacological properties of this toxin. Ascher and colleagues posit that ganglionic blockade by SGTX results from binding to the closed state of the channel-receptor complex, possibly to the receptor itself. It is 50-100 times more potent than hexamethonium, another ganglionic antagonist of nAChRs. Brown and colleagues found that the SGTX dissociation constants measured at equilibrium block in rats were 58nM and 76nM, as measured from the shift in depolarization produced by 0.2μM and 2 μM SGTX, respectively. Surugatoxin is listed on two U.S. patents, both for potential clinical treatments. US7468188 proposes the use of locally-administered neurotoxins in the treatment of muscle injury and US7214700 proposes the use of (2-Oxindol-3-ylidenyl) acetic acid derivatives as protein kinase inhibitors. Surugatoxin has not been demonstrated to be effective in either of these treatment proposals, but rather, is listed as a potentially relevant substance in these treatment plans.
