= Piero Angela =

Italian science journalist (1928–2022)

Piero Angela Knight Grand Cross OMRI
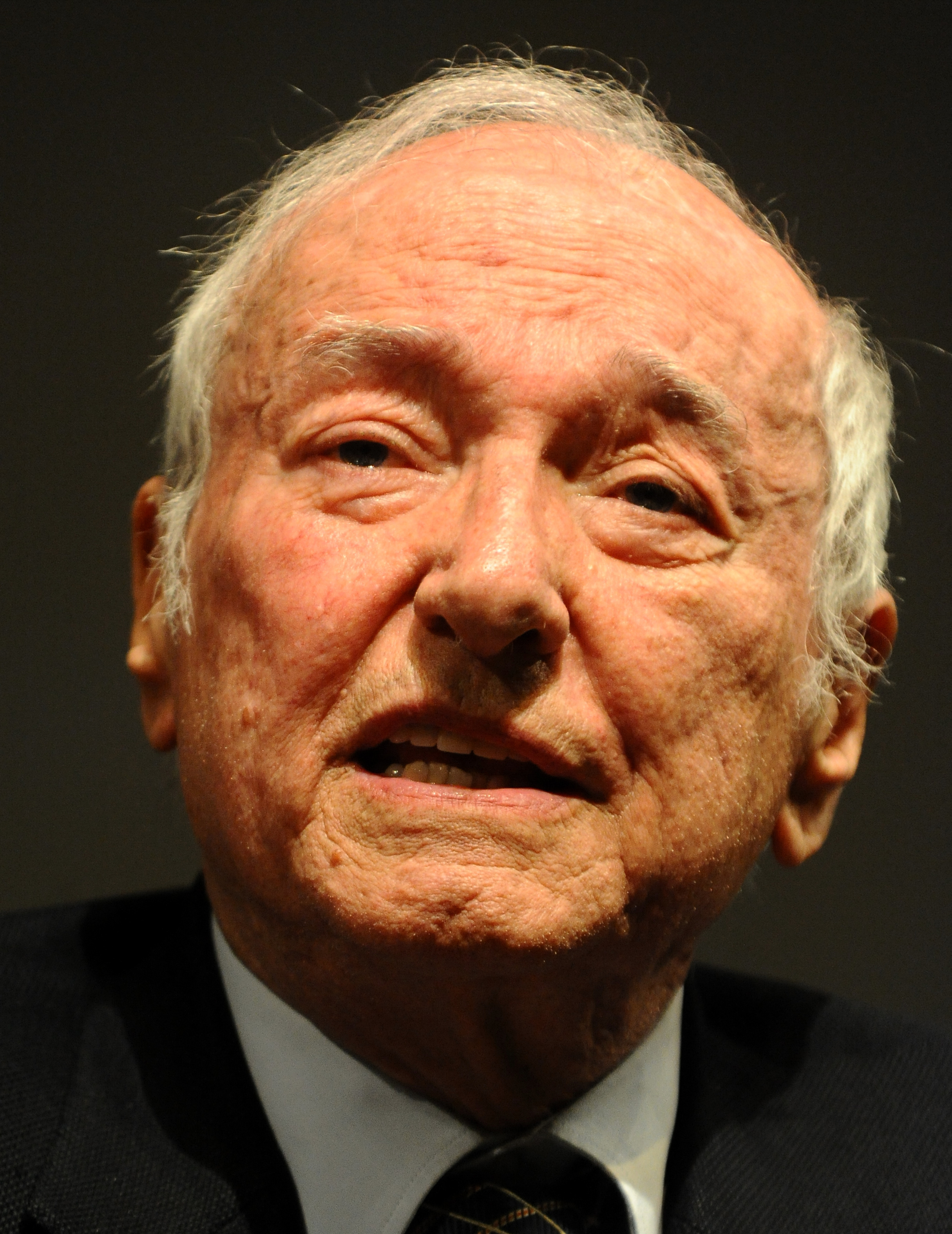
- Angela in 2013
- Born: Piero Domenico Angela; 22 December 1928; Turin, Kingdom of Italy
- Died: 13 August 2022 (aged 93); Rome, Italy
- Occupations: Science journalist; television host; essayist
- Years active: 1952–2022
- Spouse: Margherita Pastore (m. 1955)
- Children: Alberto Angela
- Awards: Kalinga Prize (1993)

Signature
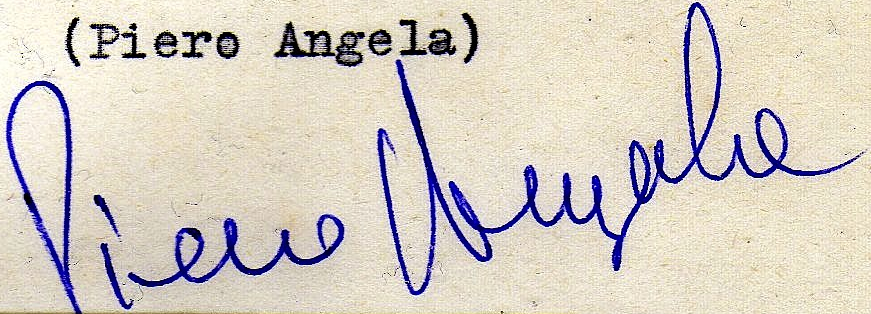

Piero Domenico Angela (Italian: [ˈpjɛːro ˈandʒela]; 22 December 1928 – 13 August 2022) was an Italian science journalist, television host, and essayist, with a brief early professional career also as a jazz musician and pianist.

He started as a radio reporter, then became a foreign correspondent, and established himself as the host of the RAI newscast. He is best known as the creator and presenter of broadcasting programmes modelled on BBC and David Attenborough documentaries, to whom he has been often compared, and also for his scientific journalism published in numerous publications.

Angela wrote thirty-three books, which sold over three million copies, received many honorary degrees, made over sixty documentaries and hundreds of television episodes, won seven Telegattos, and eight times won the national television directing award.

== Early life ==
Angela was born in Turin, the son of Nella Maglia and Carlo Angela, an anti-fascist doctor, who was awarded the Medal of the Righteous Among the Nations on 29 August 2001.

At the age of one, Angela nearly died from pneumonia. Several years later, he had a broken leg reconstructed without anaesthesia and at the age of 12 underwent an appendicitis operation; the surgery went on for two and a half hours due to complications.

Angela attended the classical high school in Turin. Angela wrote that rationality was taught to him by his father. According to his colleague Gigi Marzullo "his perfect self-control and his sympathetic friendliness is a reflection of his shy nature and encoded in the genetic code of this Piedmontese education in rationality and tolerance". Angela did well in almost all studies, but he did the minimum of work required. Angela said he received "a very Piedmontese education: very rigid, with very strict principles, including that of diffidence, never exhibiting". Angela wrote referring to his school education: "Personally, I got bored mortally in school and I was a bad student. All those involved in teaching should constantly remember the ancient Latin motto 'ludendo docere', that is, 'teach with fun'."

== Music ==
Individuals who are most successful (and not only women) are usually strong inside and courteous outside. It's a bit like the piano. I always remember what my old piano teacher used to say to me: to have a good touch you need steel fingers in velvet gloves ... Maybe in life it is like that.

— Piero Angela

Angela began taking private piano lessons when he was seven years old; he later developed an interest in jazz music. By 1948, he played in various jam sessions in Turin jazz clubs using the name Peter Angela.

In 1948 he was noticed by the then young entrepreneur Sergio Bernardini, who invited him to play on the opening night of the Capannina in Viareggio. By the early fifties Angela formed with drummer Franco Mondini and various double bass players a jazz trio. The trio was often joined by soloists, such as Nini Rosso, Franco Pisano, Nunzio Rotondo, and the former cornetist of Duke Ellington, Rex Stewart. Angela and Mondini played with Nunzio Rotondo's quartet for some time. He also played at this time with Franco Cerri, with whom in 1946, they would ride their bicycles to hear the concerts from outside of a Turin restaurant because they were unable to buy tickets.

== Journalism ==
At the end of 1951, Angela began collaborating on a programme on the history of jazz for RAI. By 1952 he stopped playing music and began working full time as a journalist. First as a reporter and contributor. Angela has spent nine years in Paris, four years in Brussels as a correspondent and toured America as a correspondent for RAI.

His wife, Margherita Pastore, gave up her career as a dancer, married Piero when she was 19, and went with Angela to Paris. According to Margherita, "We didn't make a decision, but the strange thing that you have inside and that makes you act sometimes not completely rationally, but beautifully. That same thing that had already bewitched us at first glance, during a birthday party in the home of mutual friends." While in Paris their daughter, Christine, and son, Alberto, were born. Angela had an audio recording of the birth of his two children.

Fabiano Fabiani asked to come to Rome to work on television. Fabiani said to Angela, "Enough with the speaking the news on radio, I want the journalists on television." In 1968 Angela was the first anchor alternating with Andrea Barbato on the National Television News at 13.30, the lunchtime edition of the news.

Angela wrote 33 books which have sold over three million copies, received many honorary degrees, made about sixty documentaries and hundreds of television episodes, and won seven Telegacts and eight times the National Television Directing Award.

In 1969 Angela left RAI newscast with the idea of making longer more detailed programs: "I realised that what really interested me was doing not deal with ten news items a day, but the news for a year."

== Scientific journalism ==
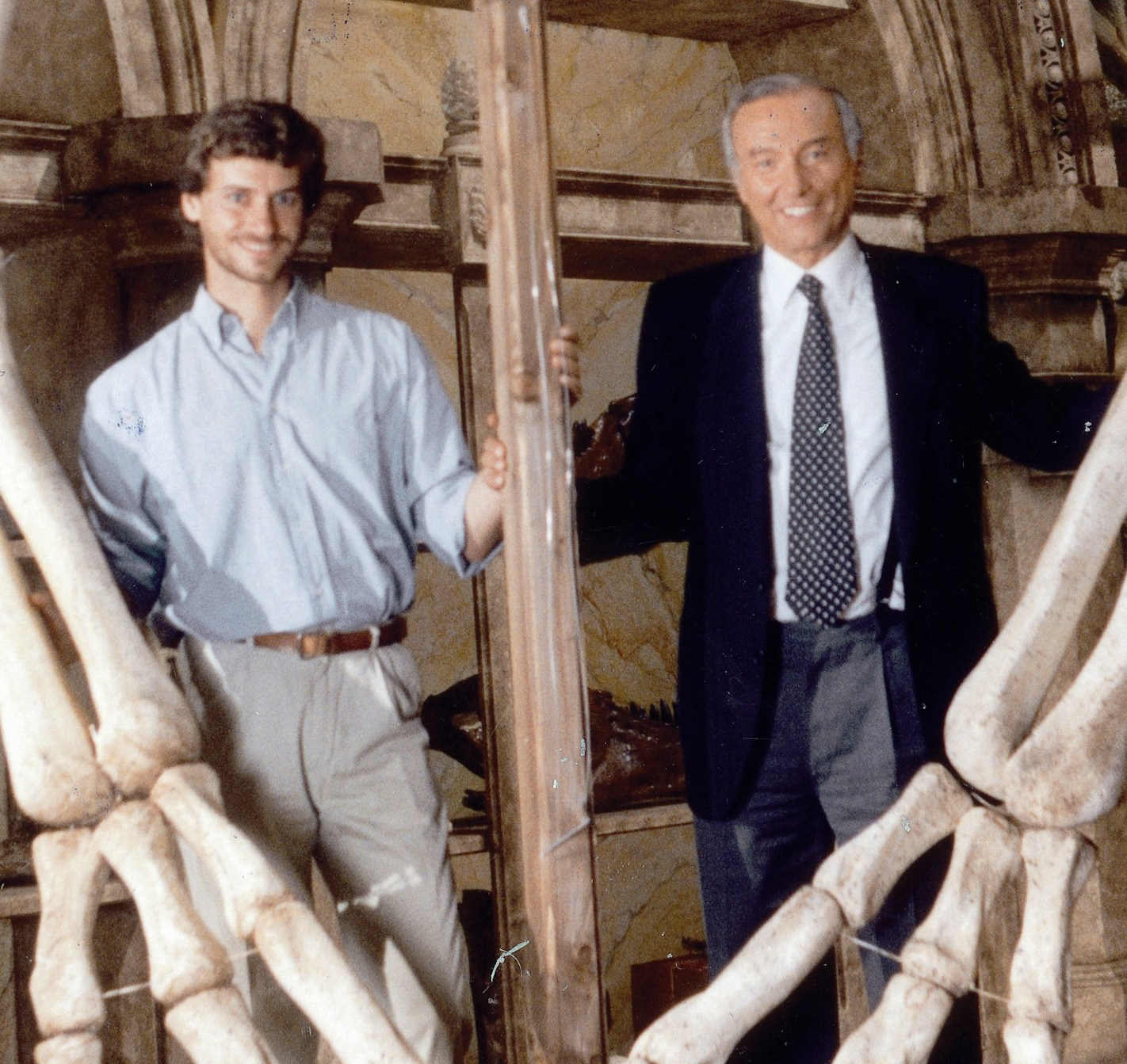
Angela with his son Alberto in 1993

Influenced by the documentary lesson of Roberto Rossellini, in 1968 Angela produced a series of documentaries entitled "The Future in Space", on the theme of the Apollo program; during the filming carried out in the United States he also made numerous live connections for RAI on the occasion of the launch of the Saturn V carrier which brought the first astronauts to the moon. Then began a long activity of scientific disclosure that in the following years led him to produce numerous information transmissions including Destinazione Uomo ('Destination Man'), Da zero a tre anni ('From zero to three years'), Dove va il mondo? ('Where does the world go?'), Nel buio degli anni luce ('In the darkness of light years'), Indagine critica sulla parapsicologia ('Critical investigation of parapsychology'), and Nel cosmo all ricerca della vita ('In the cosmos in search of life'). Starting from 1971 he hosted, for Rai 1, a series of scientific TV programmes about astronomy, biology, global economy, parapsychology, and others.

In 1981 he started his most famous show, Quark, which, as of 2022, is still active although in different forms. Quark was hosted weekly until 1983, and spawned a large number of specials and spin-offs dedicated to several scientific topics, from dinosaurs to human biology, from history to anthropology, from astronomy and cosmology to economy.

"The title is a bit curious and we borrowed it from physics, where many studies are in progress on certain hypothetical subnuclear particles called, precisely, quarks, which would be the smallest bricks of matter known so far. It is therefore an exploring into things", explained Angela during the first episode in 1981.

The Quark formula was at the time particularly innovative: all the technological means available and the resources of television communication were used to familiarise them with the topics covered: the BBC and David Attenborough documentaries, the Bruno Bozzetto cartoons used to explain the most difficult concepts, the interviews with the experts exposed in the clearest possible language compatible with the complexity of the topics, the explanations in the studio. From the basic programme, several spin-offs were born, some of which are still produced: naturalistic documentaries (Quark speciale and Il mondo di Quark), financial (Quark economia), and politicians (Quark Europa).

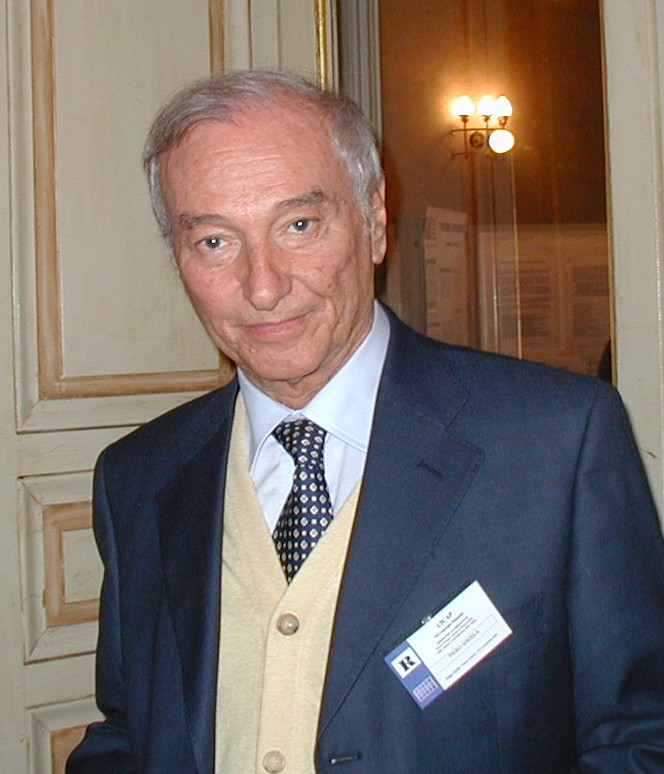
Angela in 2006

In 1984 Angela produced Pillole di Quark ('Quark's Pills'), a thirty-second spot on technical, scientific, educational, social, and medical topics, which was broadcast at variable times on Rai 1. In the same year, Angela created the first talk show for mixed entertainment for scientific dissemination: six first nights live from the Foro Italico, with guests from the world of culture, science, entertainment and sport on stage to interact with the audience.

In 1995 Quark was succeeded by Superquark, lasting two hours instead of one. Starting from 2000, Angela and his son Alberto introduced Ulisse, a monographic show dedicated to human history and discoveries.

In 1986 and 1987 he conducted two prime-time shows on climate issues from the Turin Palazzetto dello Sport, in front of eight thousand spectators: atmosphere and oceans, followed by three television series that exploited new computer graphics: a journey inside the human body ('The Wonderful Machine'), in prehistory ('The Planet of the Dinosaurs'), and in space ('Journey in the Cosmos'). These series, created in collaboration with his son Alberto, were translated into English and sold in over forty European, American and Asian countries, including Arab and Chinese countries.

In 1988 he was also involved in Quark, a series of documentaries of nature, environment, exploration, and animal world produced and made by Italian authors, including Alberto Angela [his son] himself, who made some documentaries in Africa.

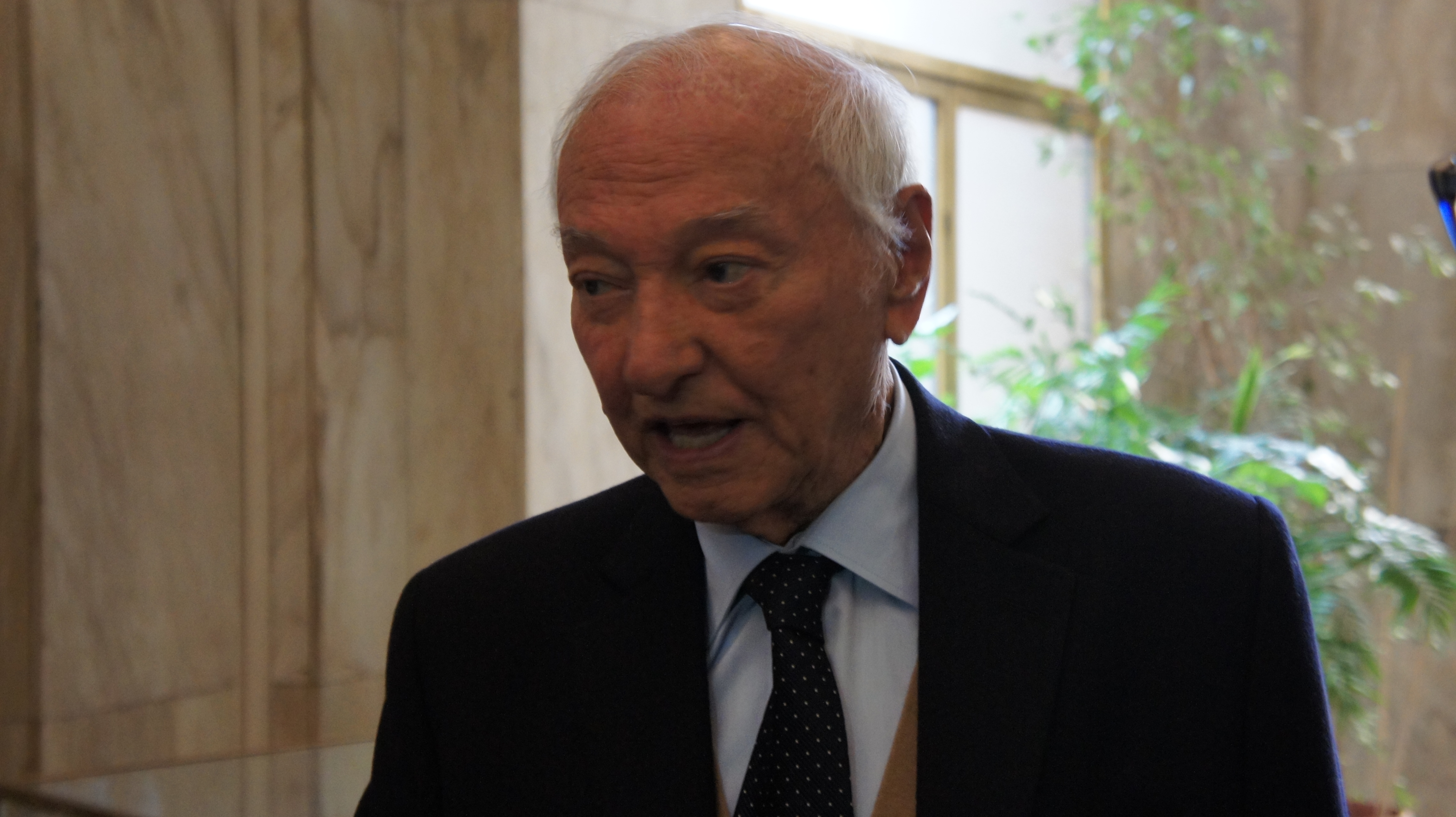
Angela in 2014

In fact, in 1995 Superquark was born, during which, on 4 June 1999, two thousand episodes of the Quark project and related subsidiaries were celebrated. That same year are also the Speciale Superquark, monothematic evenings on subjects of great social, psychological and scientific interest, and the collaboration in the television programme Domenica in, in which Angela was the anchor of a space dedicated to culture. In 1997 Quark Atlante – Immagini dal Pianeta was born from a Quark rib. Immagini dal Pianeta – RaiPlay was born from a Quark rib.

Finally, since 2000 Piero and Alberto Angela have been authors of Ulysses, a monographic instalment programme concerning historical and scientific discoveries.

Parallel to the popularising activity on television, Angela has carried out publishing activities, always with information content. He has long been the editor of the Scienza e società ('Science and Society') column in the weekly TV series TV Sorrisi e Canzoni ('TV Smiles and Songs'). Angela was also the founder and supervisor of the monthly magazine Quark, which he founded in 2001 and dissolved in 2006 due to lack of funds. The monthly magazine, inspired by the television programme dealt with scientific topics in a manner accessible to the public. Angela is also the author of over thirty books, many of them translated into English, German and Spanish, with a total circulation of over three million copies.

== Other activities ==
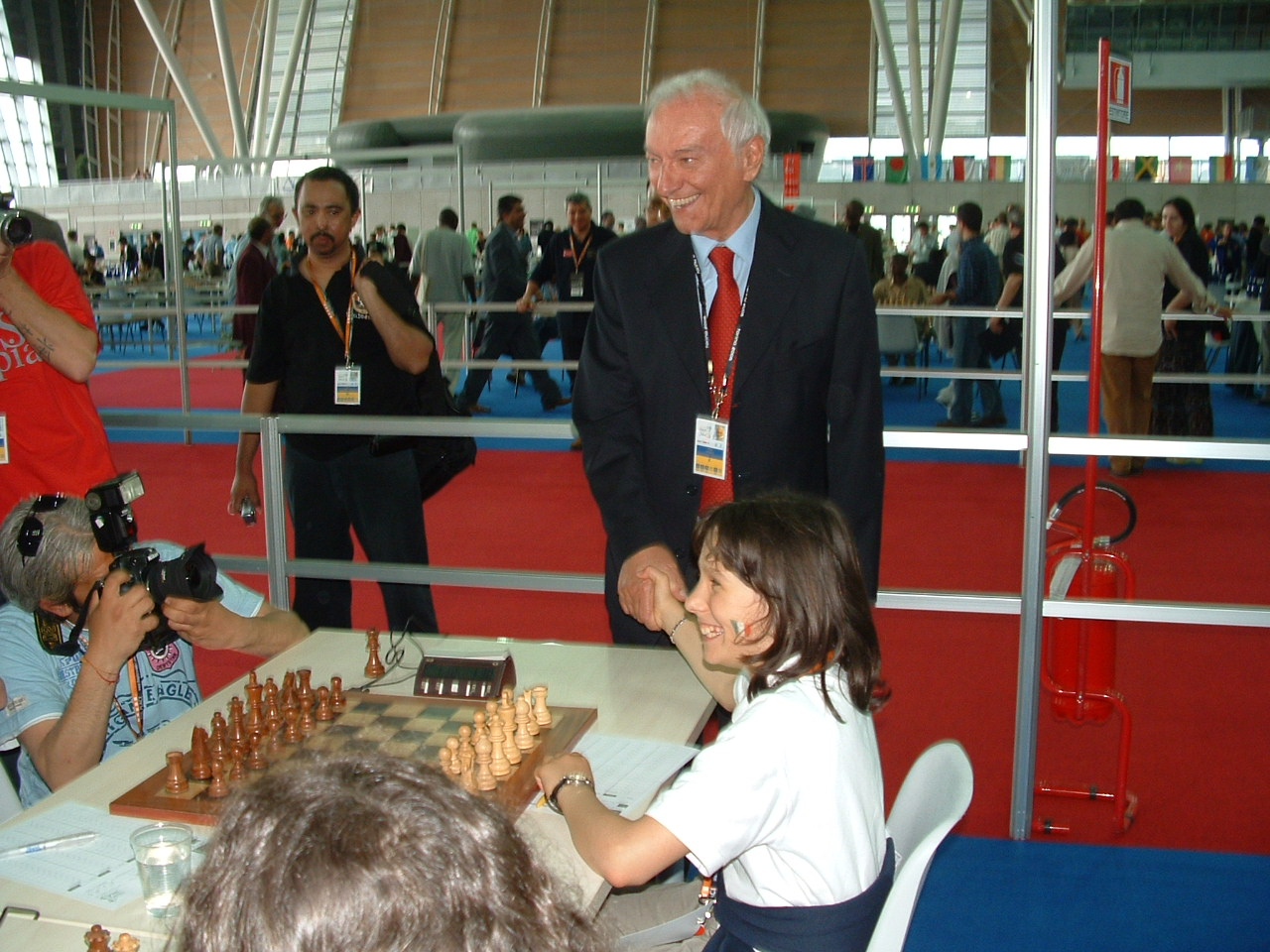
Angela shakes hands with 12 year-old Marina Brunello at the Turin 2006 chess olympiad.

In 1989, Angela was one of the founders of CICAP, a scientific committee to promote scientific education and critical thinking and devoted to verification of allegedly scientific disciplines such as parapsychology. In May 2016, he was appointed Honorary President. A slogan of the association, "We must always have an open mind, but not so open that the brain falls to the ground", has become a phrase frequently attributed to Angela, although in reality it is attributed to many people.

In 1996, the Committee for Skeptical Inquiry (CSICOP) presented Angela with the Responsibility in Journalism Award. In his program Investigation on parapsychology (1978) he revealed methods and tricks used by mediums and gurus in their activities; the interest to debunk the quackery was the basis of the birth of CICAP (Italian Committee for the Control of Claims on Pseudosciences), of which he was still honorary president.

In 2000, Angela was sued for defamation by two homeopathic associations (FIAMO and SIMO in a civil case and a criminal case), following the broadcast of Superquark of 11 July 2000 in which the homeopathic medicine was said to have no scientific foundation. Angela, defended by lawyers Giulia Bongiorno and Franco Coppi, was acquitted in both cases and the judge recognized the unscientific nature of the discipline.

Angela has also written a large number of popular books, starting with L'uomo e la marionetta in 1972. Many were in collaboration with his son Alberto.

On religions and deities, Angela had an agnostic approach and considered death a "nuisance".

== Death ==
During his last years, Angela continued to work, hosting his TV programme Superquark until 2022, when he marked 70 years of continuous activity in RAI. On 13 August 2022, Angela died in Rome at the age of 93, after a long illness. His death was announced on social media by his son Alberto. After the funeral his body was cremated.

== Honours ==
- Italy: Commander of the Order of Merit of the Italian Republic (30 May 2001)
- Italy: Italian Medal of Merit for Culture and Art (2 April 2002)
- Italy: Grand Officer of the Order of Merit of the Italian Republic (26 May 2004)
- Algeria: Medal of the Algerian Revolution Friends (March 2021)
- Italy: Knight Grand Cross of the Order of Merit of the Italian Republic (26 April 2021)

== Awards ==
- Angela has received many honorary degrees. In addition to numerous awards in Italy and abroad, in 1993 he received the Kalinga Award for scientific dissemination by UNESCO and in 2002 the gold medal for the culture of the Italian Republic.
- He received seven telegatti, of which one oversaw his entire career – awarded on 22 January 2008.
- On 3 October 2010 he received the Special Jury Prize of the Literary Award Giuseppe Dessì.
- The asteroid 7197 discovered by astronomers Andrea Boattini and Maura Tombelli bears his name: Pieroangela.
- There is an extant gastropod mollusk (Babylonia pieroangelai) and an extinct bird (Shuilingornis angelai) named in his honor.
- Padua, a city linked to Galileo, recognized its honorary citizenship for its "contribution of excellence given to scientific dissemination".
- Turin, his hometown, on 23 October 2017, decided to give him honorary citizenship for "the living confirmation of the scientific tradition of the city" and having contributed with his professional career to increase "culture and knowledge" of the Italians also through the television medium.

Academic

- Honorary degree in Natural Sciences – University of Camerino, 26 January 1988
- Honorary degree in Biology – University of Ferrara, Ferrara, 15 February 1992
- Honorary degree in Biological Sciences – University of Palermo, Palermo, 30 June 2001
- Honorary degree in Physics – University of Turin, Turin, 23 June 2003
- Honorary degree in Veterinary Medicine – University of Bari, Bari, 18 November 2004
- Honorary degree in Materials science and technology – University of Rome Tor Vergata, Rome, 5 April 2016
- Honorary degree in Applied Biology and Experimental Medicine – University of Messina, Messina, 24 November 2017
- Honorary Degree in Communication Science and Technology University of Siena, Siena, 15 June 2019
- Honorary degree – American University of Rome, Rome
- Diploma honoris causa in Piano – International Piano Academy "Incontri da maestro", Imola

== List of television programmes ==
All the following programmes have been broadcast by Rai Uno.

- Il futuro nello spazio (1968)
- Destinazione uomo (1971)
- Da zero a tre anni
- Dove va il mondo?
- Nel buio degli anni luce
- Indagine sulla parapsicologia (1978)
- Nel cosmo alla ricerca della vita (1980)
- Quark (since 1981), and related sister projects:
  - Pillole di Quark (since 1983)
  - Il mondo di Quark (since 1984)
  - Quark Economia (1986)
  - Quark Europa (1986)
  - Quark Speciale
  - Quark Scienza
  - Enciclopedia di Quark (1993)
  - Superquark (since 1994)
  - Speciali di Superquark (since 1999)
- La macchina meravigliosa (1990)
- Serata Oceano (1991)
- Il pianeta dei dinosauri (1993)
- Viaggio nel cosmo (1998)

== Selected bibliography ==
- Nel buio degli anni luce (1977)
- Nel cosmo alla ricerca della vita (1980)
- The Extraordinary Story of Human Origins (1989, with Alberto Angela)
- Da zero a tre anni (1990)
- La macchina per pensare (1990)
- The Extraordinary Story of Life on Earth (1996, with Alberto Angela)
- Sharks!: Predators of the Sea (1997, with Alberto Angela and Alberto Luca Recchi)
- Viaggio nel cosmo (1997)
- Premi & punizioni. Alla ricerca della felicità (2000)
- Ti amerò per sempre. La scienza dell'amore (2005)
- Tredici miliardi di anni. Il romanzo dell'universo e della vita (2017)
