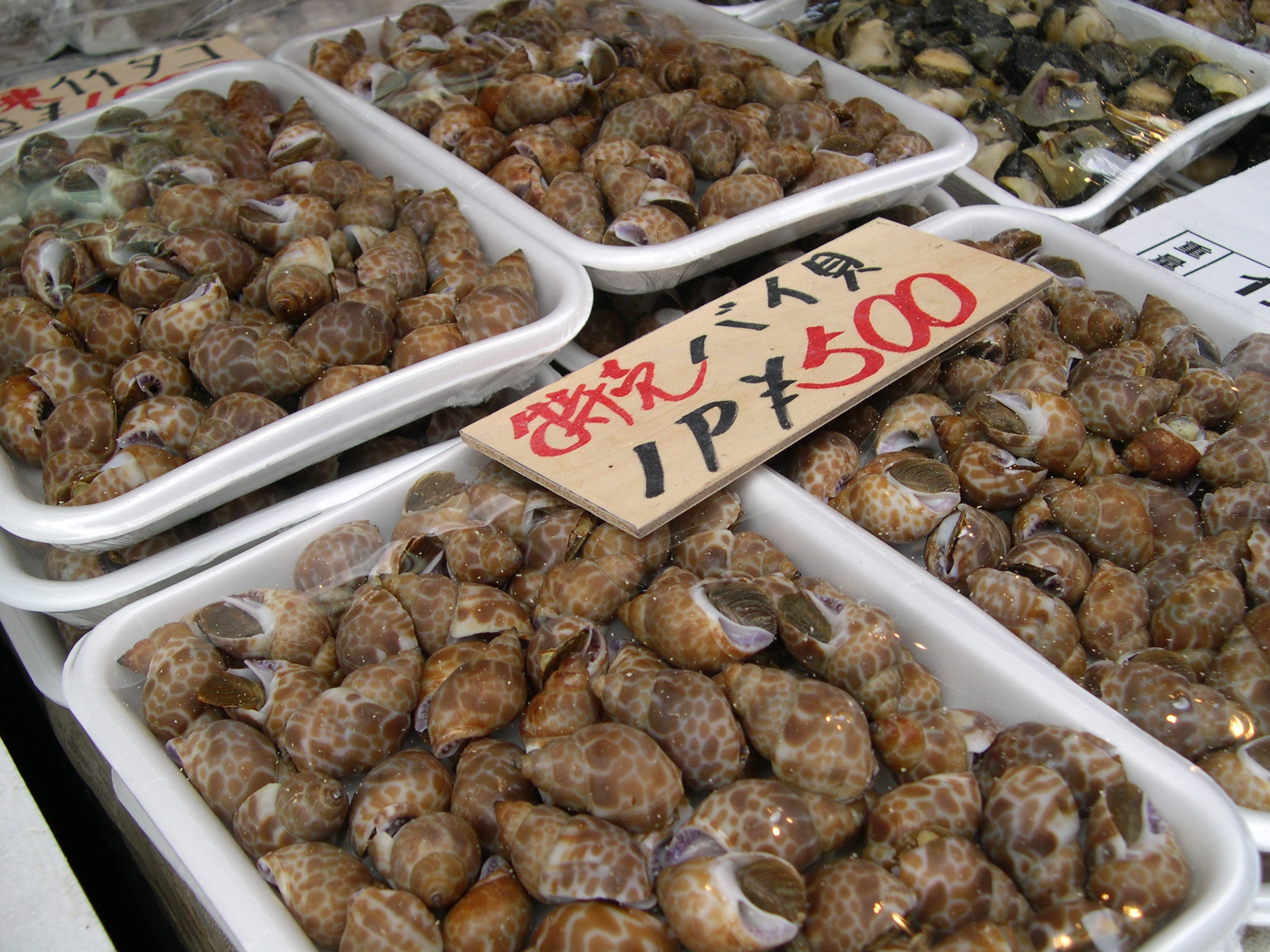
- Babylonia zeylanica (Bruguiere, 1789) (Babyloniidae) from the Indian Ocean for sale at a fishmarket in Tokyo, Japan. 500 Yen / 1 pack

Scientific classification
- Kingdom: Animalia
- Phylum: Mollusca
- Class: Gastropoda
- Subclass: Caenogastropoda
- Order: Neogastropoda
- Family: Babyloniidae
- Genus: Babylonia
- Species: B. zeylanica

Binomial name
- Babylonia zeylanica (Bruguière, 1789)

Synonyms
- Buccinum giratum Röding, 1798; Buccinum zeylanicum Bruguière, 1789

= Babylonia zeylanica =

Species of gastropod

Babylonia zeylanica is a species of sea snail, a marine gastropod mollusk, in the family Babyloniidae.

== Description ==
Shell size 55-60 mm.

== Distribution ==
Indian Ocean. Trawled at 40-60 m. offshore Madras, India.
