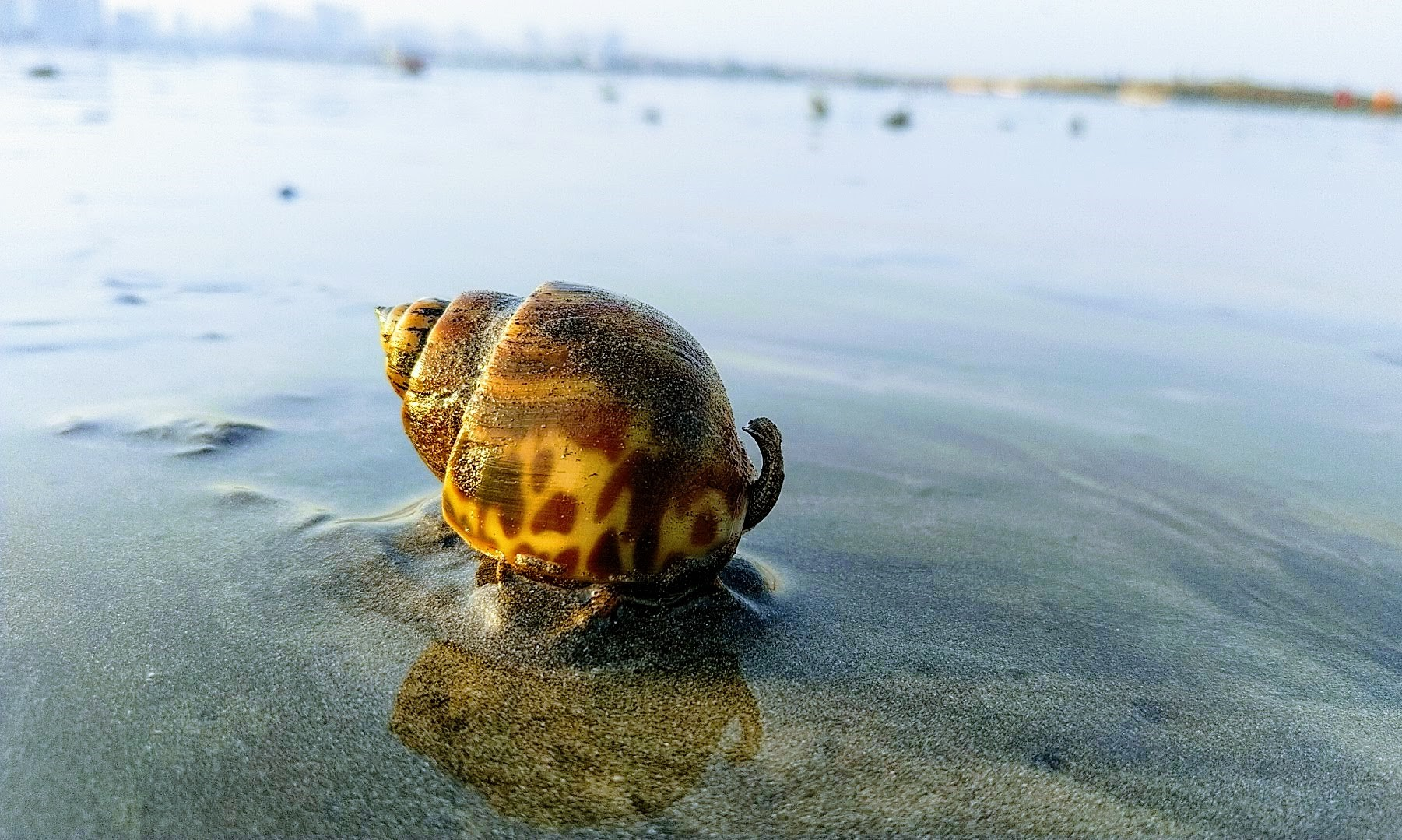

Scientific classification
- Kingdom: Animalia
- Phylum: Mollusca
- Class: Gastropoda
- Subclass: Caenogastropoda
- Order: Neogastropoda
- Family: Babyloniidae
- Genus: Babylonia
- Species: B. spirata

Binomial name
- Babylonia spirata (Linnaeus, 1758)

Synonyms
- Ancilla pallida Perry, 1811; Babylonia hongkongensis Lai & Guo, 2010; Babylonia spirata balinensis Cossignani, 2009; Babylonia spirata f. chrysostoma (G. B. Sowerby II, 1866); Buccinum spiratum Linnaeus, 1758; Buccinum spiratum var. alborubra Spalowsky, 1795; Eburna chrysostoma G. B. Sowerby II, 1866; Eburna semipicta G. B. Sowerby II, 1866; Nassa canaliculata Schumacher, 1817; Nassa molliana Chemnitz, 1780

= Babylonia spirata =

Species of gastropod

Babylonia spirata, common name the Spiral Babylon, is a species of sea snail, a marine gastropod mollusk, in the family Babyloniidae. It is the type species of the genus Babylonia.

Babylonia spirata is similar in appearance to B. zeylanica, but the whorl of B. spirata has a raised shoulder resulting in a sort of channel around the spire.
