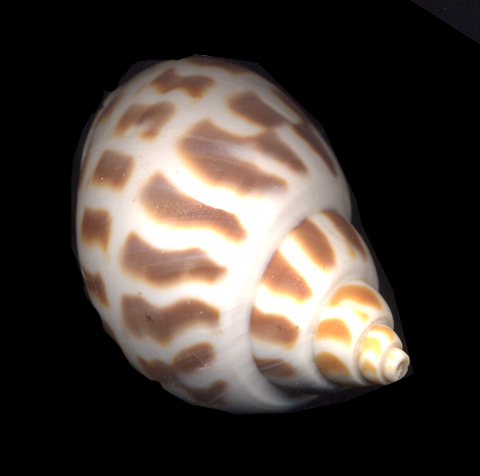
- Apical view of a shell of Babylonia areolata

Scientific classification
- Kingdom: Animalia
- Phylum: Mollusca
- Class: Gastropoda
- Subclass: Caenogastropoda
- Order: Neogastropoda
- Family: Babyloniidae
- Genus: Babylonia; Schlüter, 1838

Synonyms
- Eburna (Babylonia) Schlüter, 1838; Galanthis Gistel, 1848; Latrunculus Gray, 1847 (Objective synonym, with the same type species); Peridipsaccus Rovereto, 1900

= Babylonia (gastropod) =

Genus of gastropods

Babylonia is a genus of sea snails, marine gastropod mollusks in the family Babyloniidae.

== Species ==
According to the World Register of Marine Species (WoRMS), the following species with valid names are included within the genus Babylonia:

Image	Binomial name
	Babylonia ambulacrum
	Babylonia areolata
	Babylonia canaliculata (taxonomic status uncertain)
	Babylonia feicheni
	Babylonia formosae
	Babylonia japonica
	Babylonia lutosa
	Babylonia pieroangelai
	Babylonia spirata
	Babylonia valentiana
	Babylonia zeylanica

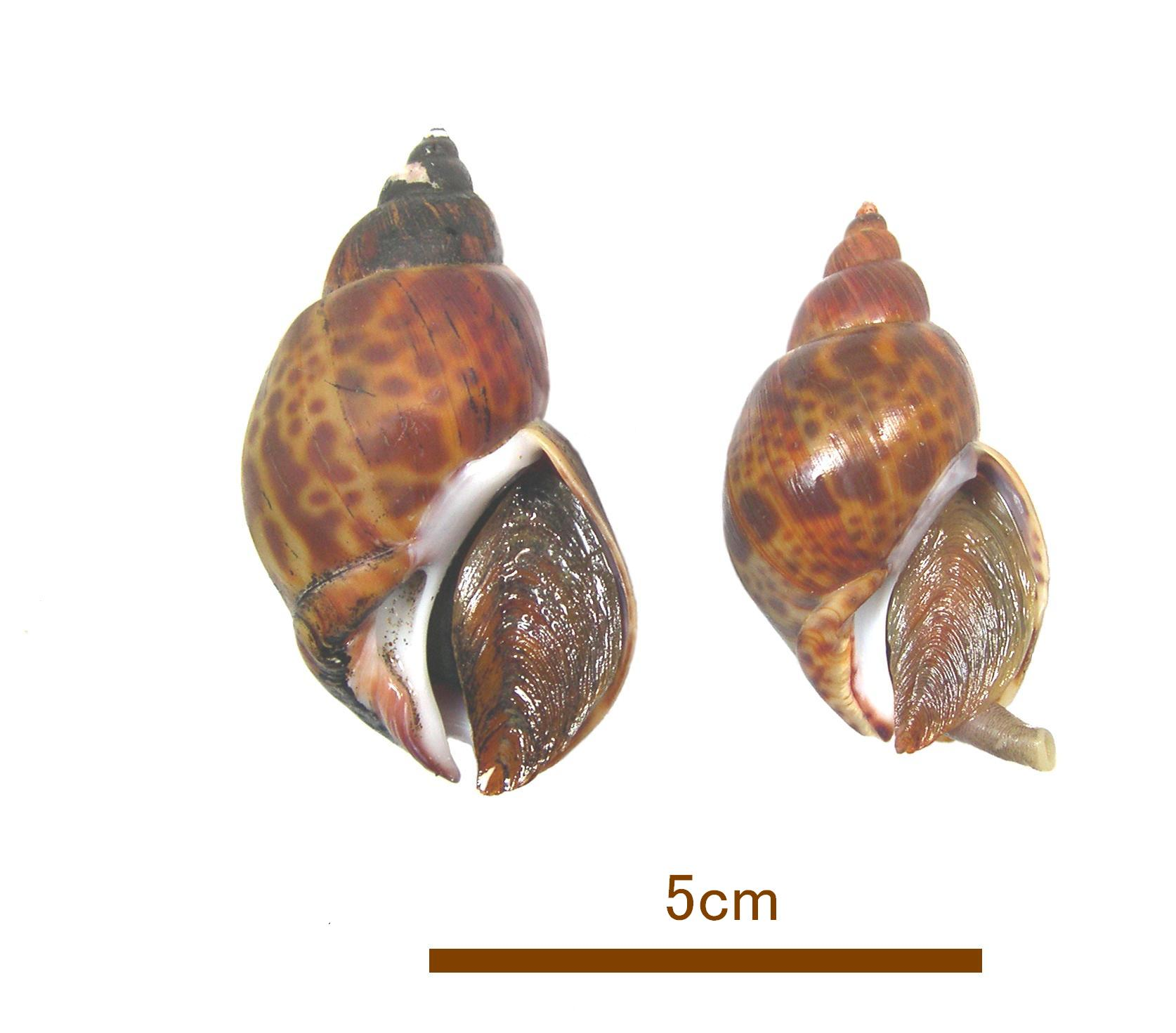
Two live but retracted individuals of Babylonia japonica

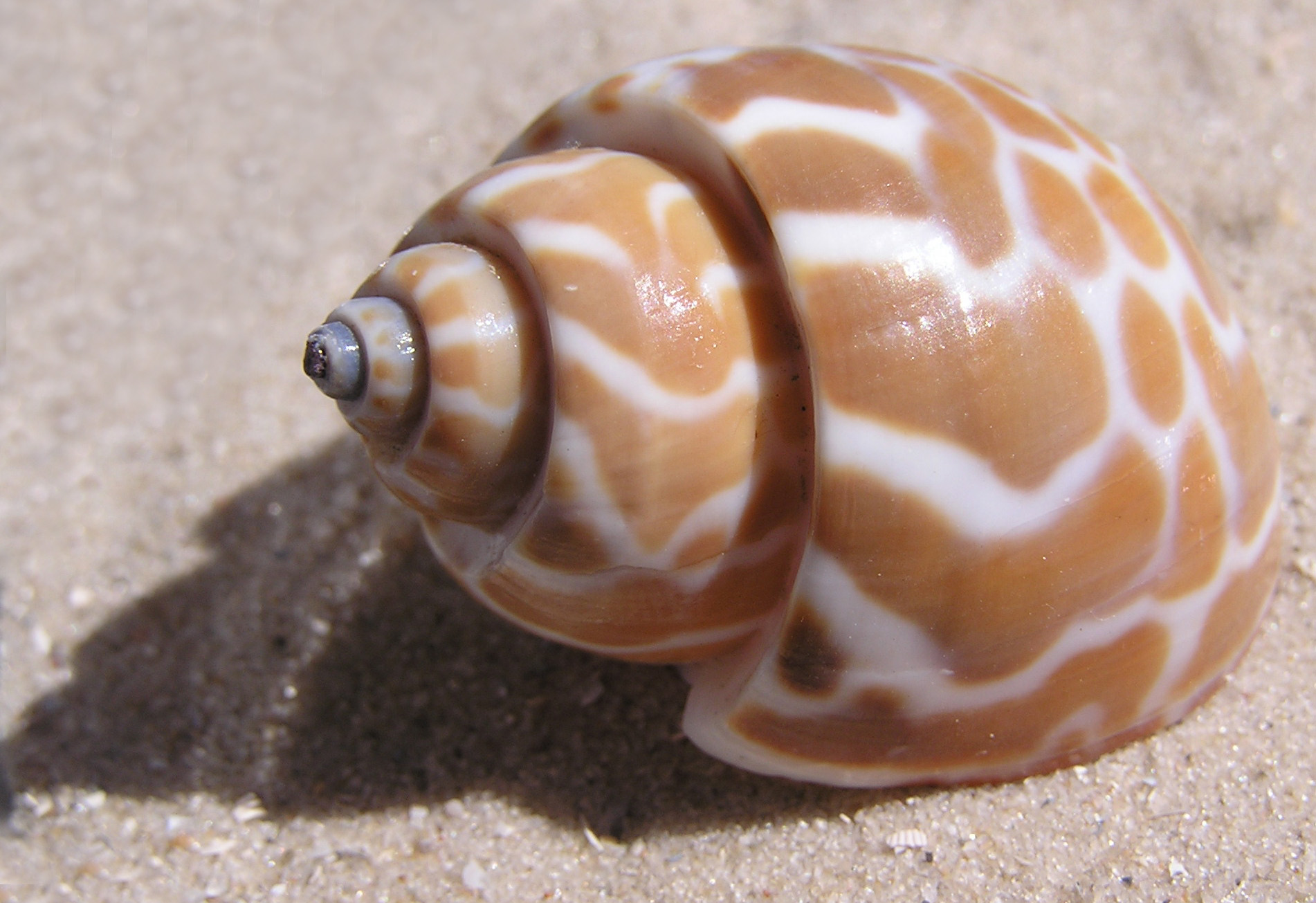
A shell of Babylonia spirata

The following species were brought into synonymy:

- Babylonia habei van Regteren Altena & Gittenberger, 1981
- Babylonia hongkongensis Lai & Guo, 2010
- Babylonia lani Gittenberger & Goud, 2003
- Babylonia magnifica Fraussen & Stratmann, 2005
- Babylonia pallida Kira, 1959
- Babylonia pallida Hirase, 1934
- Babylonia papillaris (Sowerby I, 1825)
- Babylonia pintado Kilburn, 1971
- Babylonia pulchrelineata Kilburn, 1973
- Babylonia rosadoi Bozzetti, 1998
- Babylonia tessellata (Swainson, 1823)

=== Extinct species ===
- Babylonia leonis van Regteren Altena & Gittenberger, 1972
