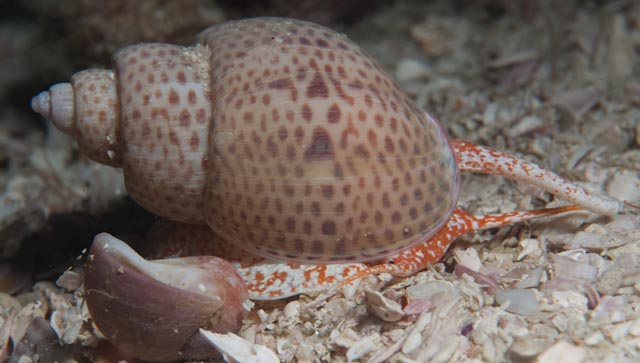
- a live Zemiropsis papillaris

Scientific classification
- Kingdom: Animalia
- Phylum: Mollusca
- Class: Gastropoda
- Subclass: Caenogastropoda
- Order: Neogastropoda
- Family: Babyloniidae
- Genus: Zemiropsis
- Species: Z. papillaris

Binomial name
- Zemiropsis papillaris (G.B. Sowerby I, 1825)

Synonyms
- Babylonia papillaris (G.B. Sowerby I, 1825); Eburna papillaris G.B. Sowerby I, 1825; Eburna millepunctata Turton, W.H., 1932; Zemiropsis joostei Dekkers, 2008

= Zemiropsis papillaris =

Species of gastropod

Zemiropsis papillaris, common name : the spotted babylon, is a species of sea snail, a marine gastropod mollusk in the family Babyloniidae.

== Description ==
The spotted babylon has a plump shell, which varies in size between 33 mm and 50 mm. The shell has a smooth surface and is white with reddish-brown spots in an indistinct lattice pattern. The foot is spotted with vivid red.

== Distribution ==
This species is only found off the South African coast from False Bay to the eastern Transkei in 15-65m under water. It is endemic to this area.
