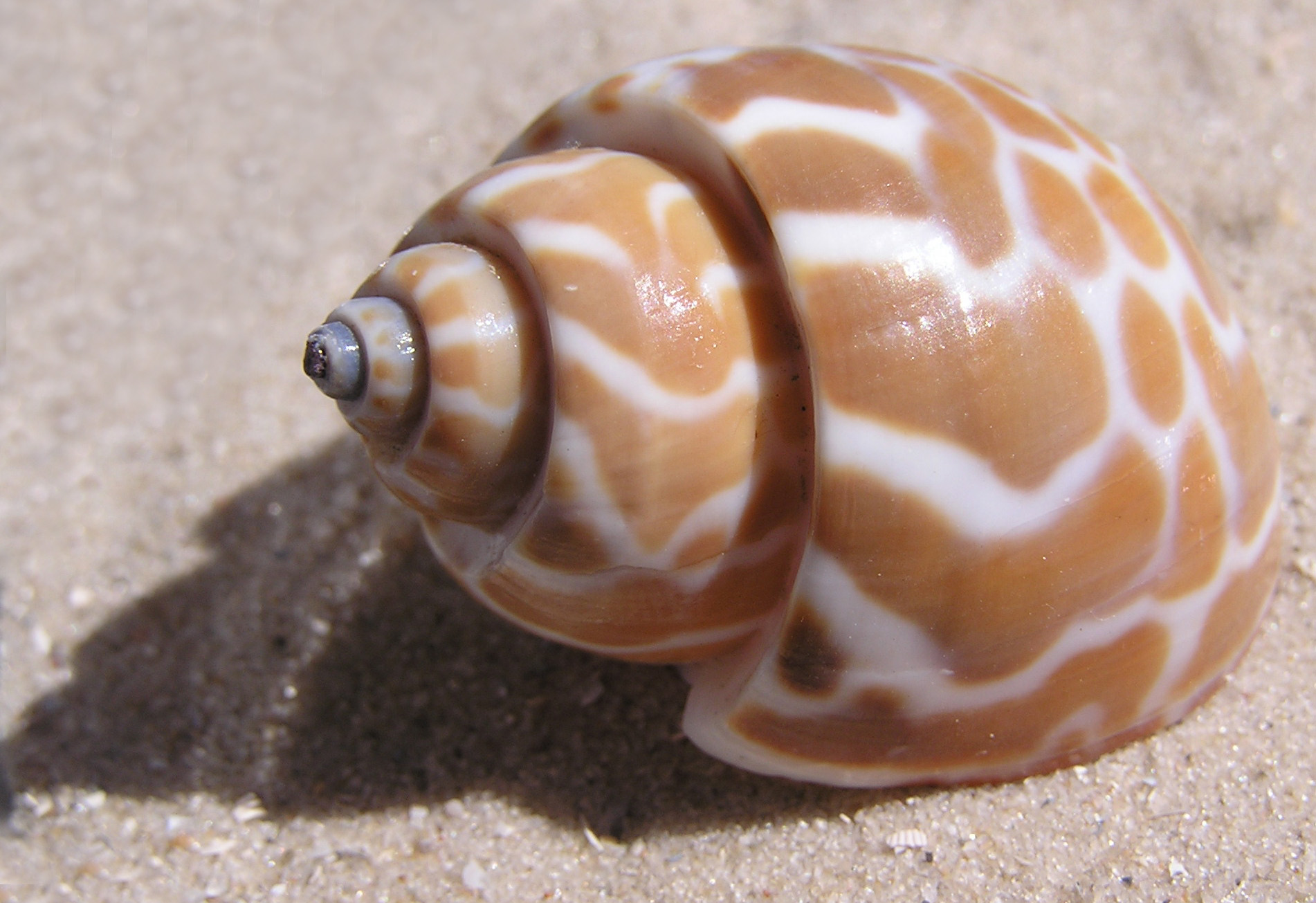
- Babylonia spirata

Scientific classification
- Kingdom: Animalia
- Phylum: Mollusca
- Class: Gastropoda
- Subclass: Caenogastropoda
- Order: Neogastropoda
- Family: Babyloniidae; T. Kuroda, T. Habe & K. Oyama, 1971

Genera
- See text

Synonyms
- Dipsaccinae P. Fischer, 1884; Eburninae Swainson, 1840; Latrunculinae Cossmann, 1901

= Babyloniidae =

Family of sea snails

Babyloniidae is a family of predatory sea snails, marine gastropod molluscs unassigned to a superfamily within the order Neogastropoda.

== Nomenclature ==
Three family-group names are older than Babyloniidae. Swainson based his concept of Eburninae on species of Babylonia, but he misidentified Eburna, the type species of which belongs to the family Olividae; under Art. 41 of the Code, the case should be resolved by the ICZN. Dipsaccinae and Latrunculinae are based on junior synonyms of Babylonia, none of which has been used in recent decades. However, Latrunculus has sporadically been used as valid shortly after 1899 (e.g. by Cossmann 1901 when he established the subfamily name), so that Babyloniidae cannot be protected automatically under ICZN Art. 23.9 (Reversal of precedence). The case has to be submitted to the ICZN to conserve the name Babyloniidae. [Bouchet & Rocroi 2005]

== Genera ==
Genera within the Babyloniidae are as follows:

- Babylonia F. Schlüter, 1838
- Zemiropsis Thiele, 1929

Genera brought into synonymy

- Galanthis Gistel, 1848: synonym of Babylonia Schlüter, 1838
- Latrunculus Gray, 1847: synonym of Babylonia Schlüter, 1838
- Peridipsaccus Rovereto, 1900: synonym of Babylonia Schlüter, 1838
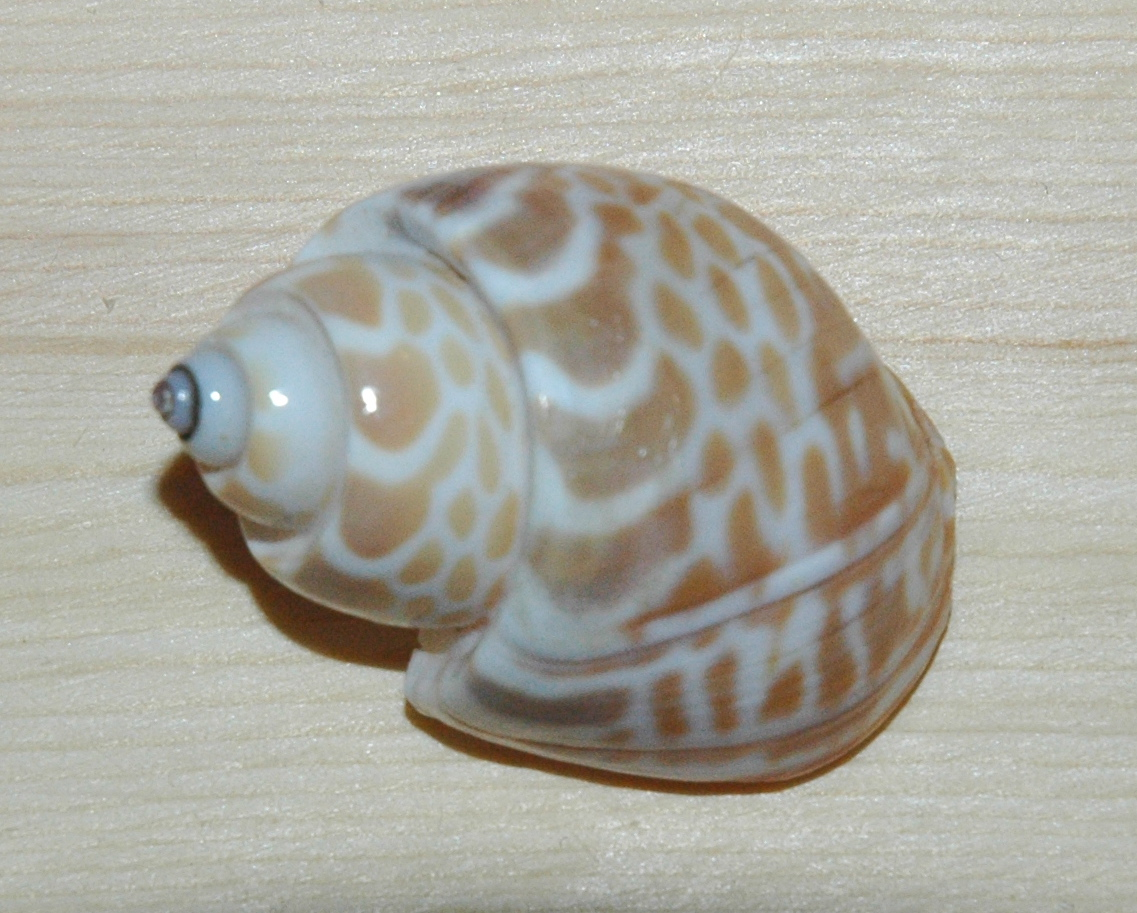
Babylonia canaliculata

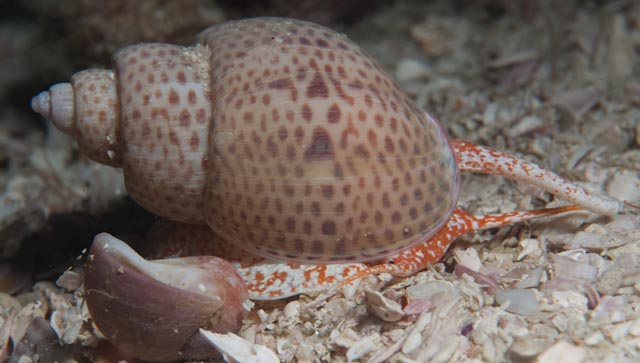
Zemiropsis papillaris
