= La Cassa =

- Comune
- Comune di La Cassa
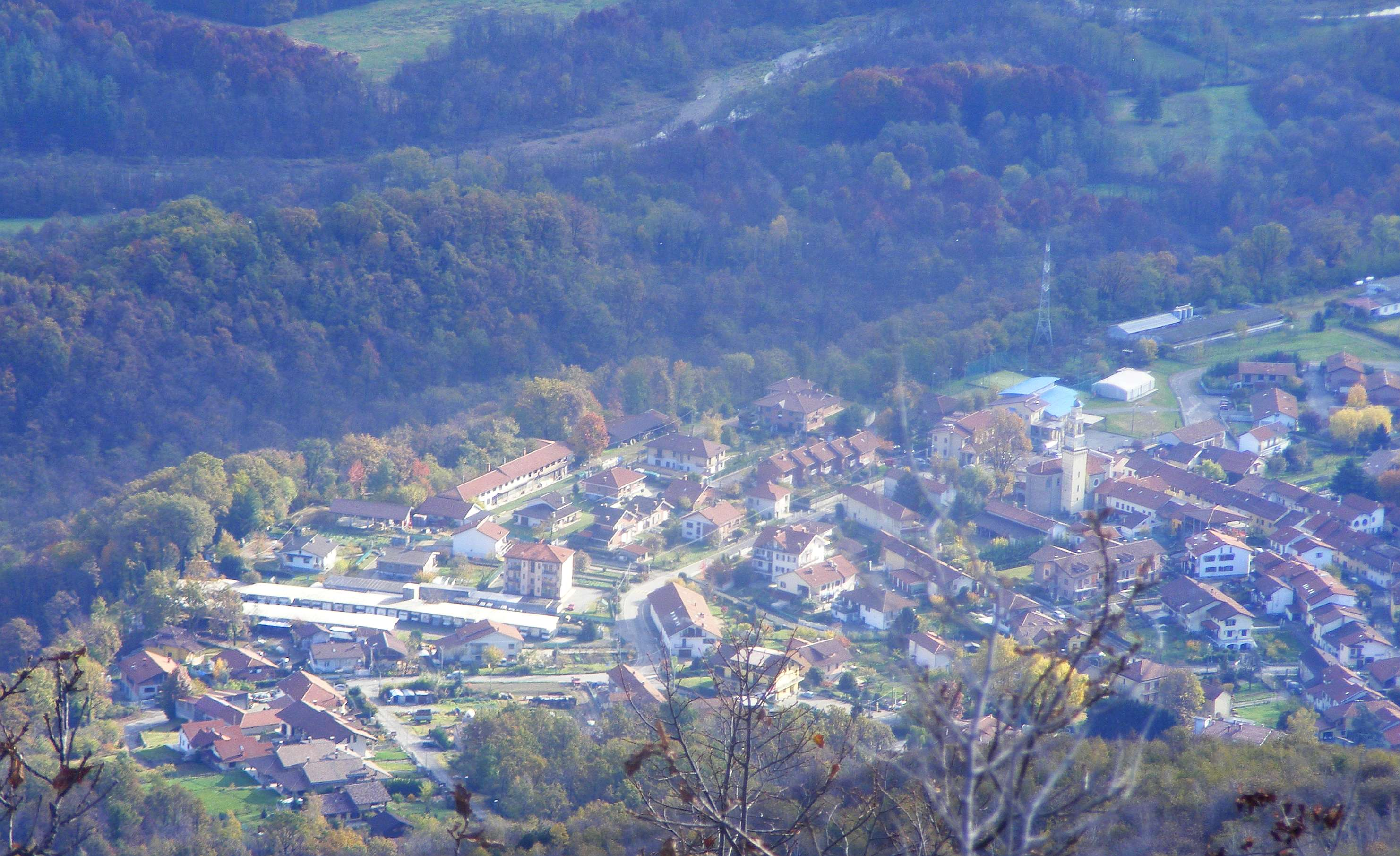

- Coat of arms

- Location within Italy Location within Piedmont
- Coordinates: 45°10′N 7°31′E
- Country: Italy
- Region: Piedmont
- Metropolitan city: Turin (TO)
- Frazioni: Truc di Miola

Government
  - Mayor: Roberto Rolle

Area
  - Total: 12.04 km^{2} (4.65 sq mi)
- Elevation: 374 m (1,227 ft)

Population (1-1-2017)
  - Total: 1,801
  - Density: 149.6/km^{2} (387.4/sq mi)
- Demonym: Lacassese(i)
- Time zone: UTC+1 (CET)
  - Summer (DST): UTC+2 (CEST)
- Postal code: 10040
- Dialing code: 011
- Patron saint: St. Lawrence
- Website: Official website

La Cassa is a comune (municipality) in the Metropolitan City of Turin in the Italian region Piedmont, located about 20 kilometres (12 mi) northwest of Turin.

La Cassa borders the following municipalities: Fiano, Varisella, Druento, Givoletto and San Gillio.
