= San Gillio =

- Comune
- Comune di San Gillio
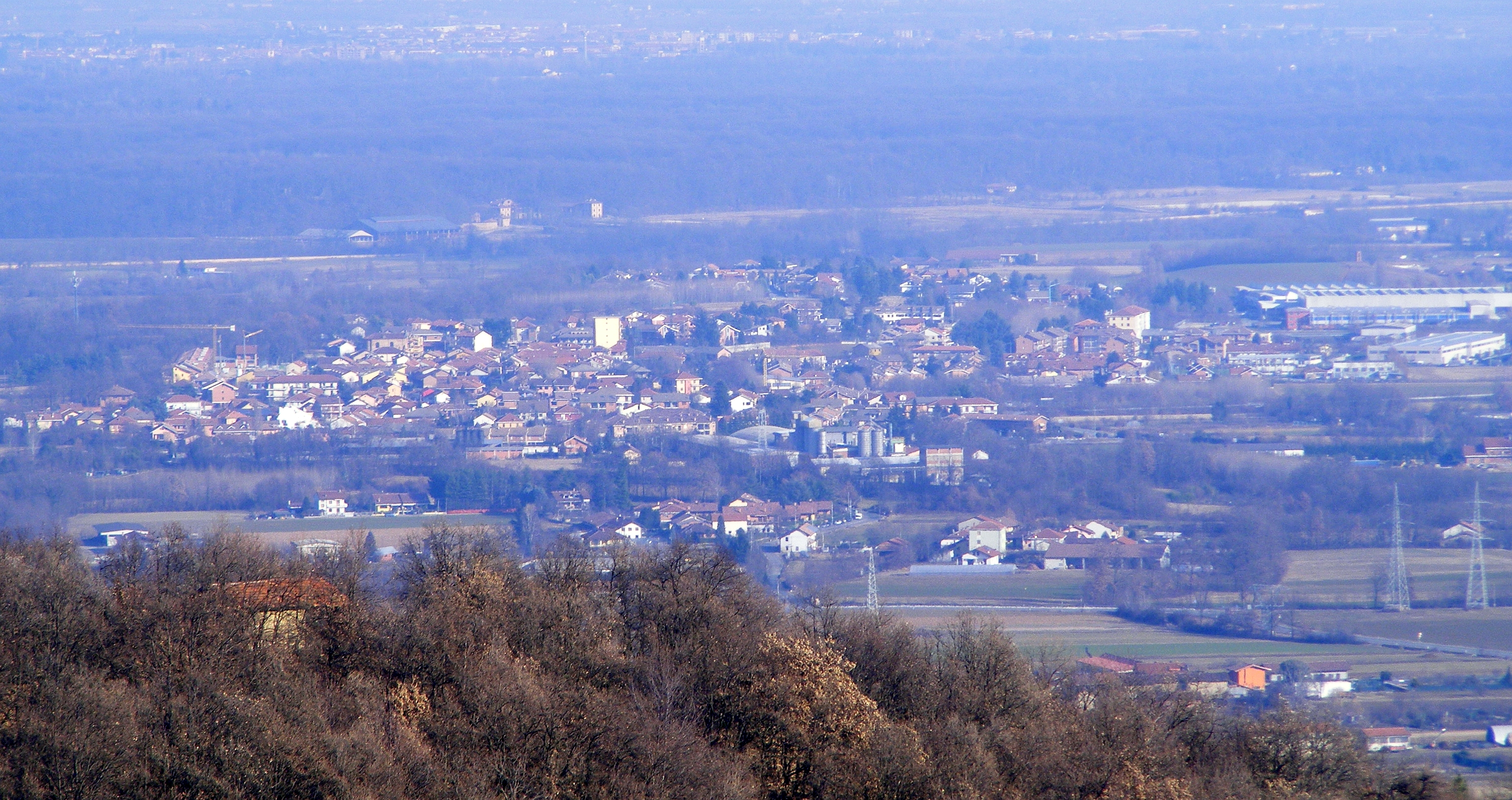
- San Gillio seen from Mount Musinè.

- Coat of arms

- Location within Italy Location within Piedmont
- Coordinates: 45°08′28″N 7°32′13″E
- Country: Italy
- Region: Piedmont
- Metropolitan city: Turin (TO)

Government
  - Mayor: Maria Grazia La Monica

Area
  - Total: 8.9 km^{2} (3.4 sq mi)
- Elevation: 320 m (1,050 ft)

Population (31 December 2010)
  - Total: 3,035
  - Density: 340/km^{2} (880/sq mi)
- Demonym: Sangilliesi
- Time zone: UTC+1 (CET)
  - Summer (DST): UTC+2 (CEST)
- Postal code: 10040
- Dialing code: 011
- Patron saint: Saint Giles
- Saint day: September 1
- Website: Official website

San Gillio (literally "Saint Giles") is a comune (municipality) in the Metropolitan City of Turin in the Italian region Piedmont, located about 15 kilometres (9 mi) northwest of Turin.

San Gillio borders the following municipalities: La Cassa, Val della Torre, Druento, Givoletto, Pianezza, and Alpignano. The economy is mostly based on agriculture.
