= Monte Lera =

Mountain in Italy

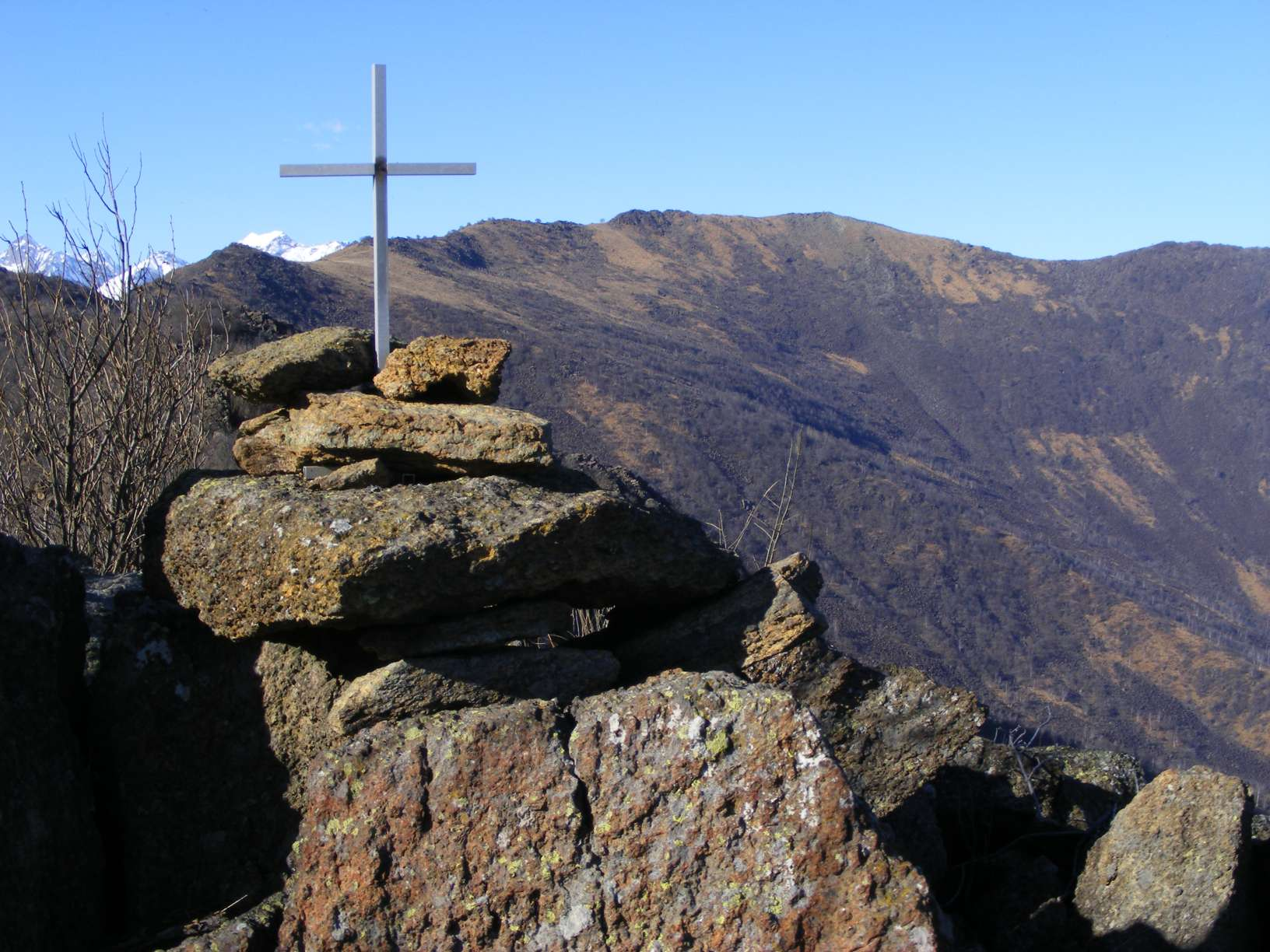
- The summit of Monte Lera

Highest point
- Elevation: 1,368 m (4,488 ft)
- Coordinates: 45°10′47″N 07°27′14″E

Geography
- Location within Alps
- Location: Province of Turin, Italy
- Parent range: Graian Alps

Monte Lera is a mountain in the Alpi di Lanzo, a sub-group of the Graian Alps, with an elevation of 1,368 m. It is located between the Val Casternone and the Ceronda valley in the communes of Val della Torre, Varisella and Givoletto.

It houses a sanctuary dedicated to the Madonna of the Snow, included in a regional reserve instituted in 1984 to protect the rare Euphorbia gibelliana.

== SOIUSA classification ==
According to the SOIUSA (International Standardized Mountain Subdivision of the Alps) the mountain can be classified in the following way:

- main part = Western Alps
- major sector = North Western Alps
- section = Graian Alps
- subsection = Southern Graian Alps
- supergroup = catena Rocciamelone-Charbonel
- group = gruppo del Rocciamelone
- subgroup = cresta Lunella-Arpone
- code = I/B-7.I-A.2.b
