= Ceronda =

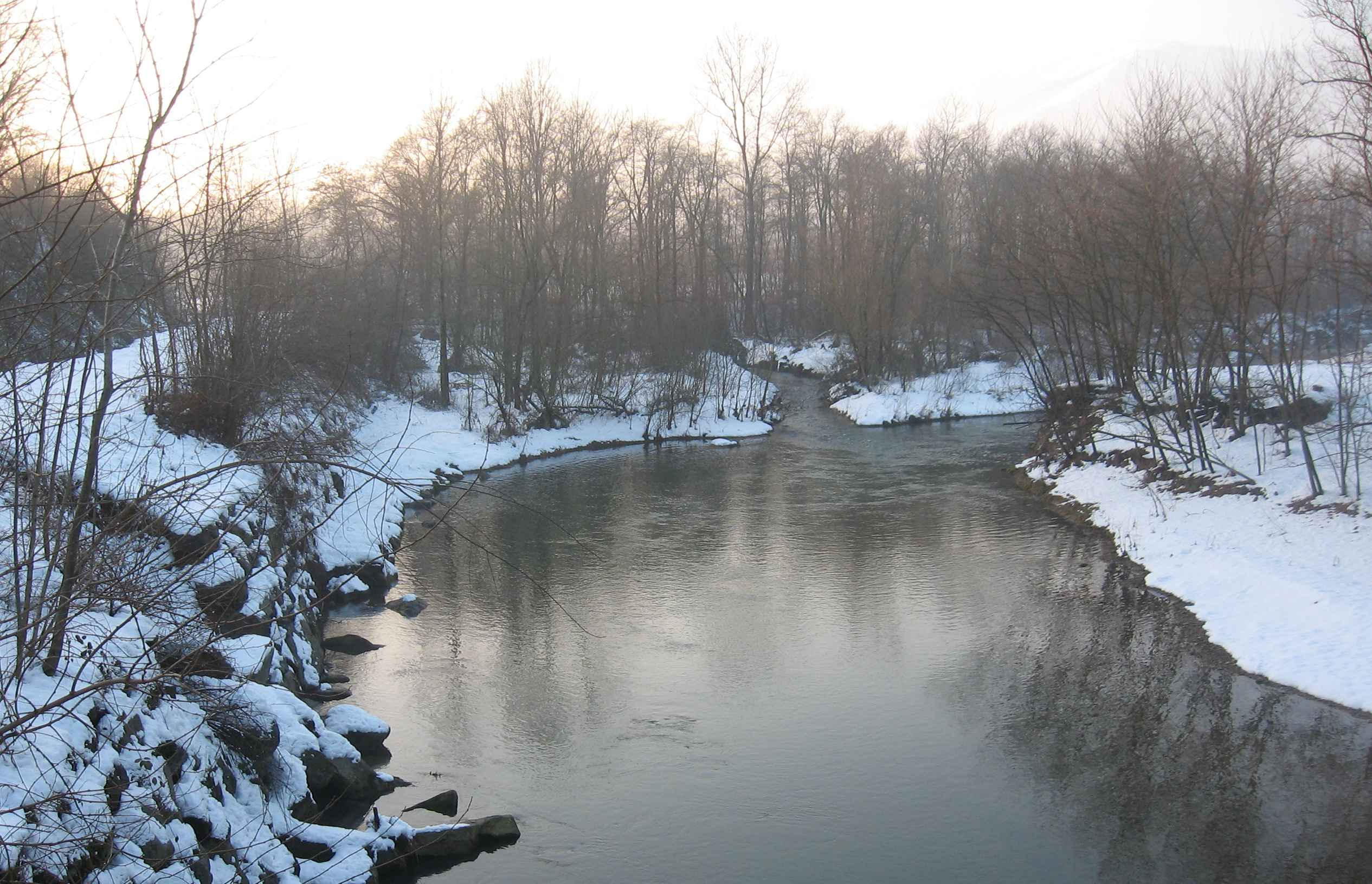
- The Ceronda near Druento

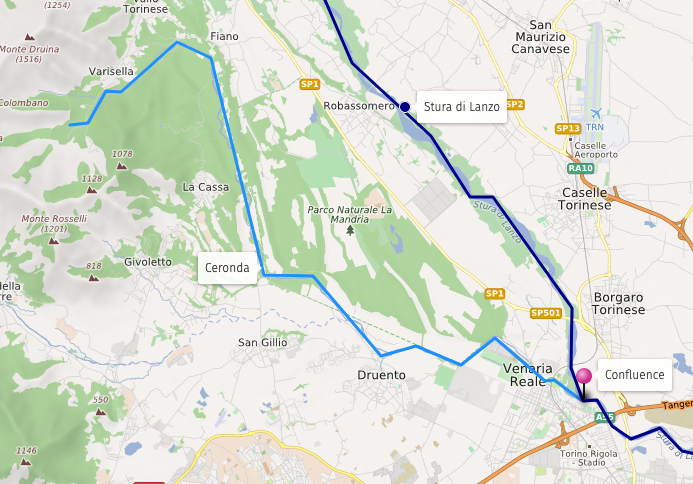

Location
- Country: Italy: Metropolitan City of Turin

Physical characteristics
- Source
  - location: Monte Colombano northern slopes
  - elevation: 1,350 m (4,430 ft)
- Mouth
  - location: Stura di Lanzo in Venaria Reale
  - coordinates: 45°07′52″N 7°38′36″E
  - elevation: 242.0 m (794.0 ft)
- Length: 22 km (14 mi)
- Basin size: 142.1 km^{2} (54.9 mi^{2})
- Discharge
  - average: (mouth) 3.4 m^{3}/s (120 cu ft/s)

Basin features
- Progression: Stura di Lanzo→ Po→ Adriatic Sea
- Tributaries
  - left: Rio Tronta
  - right: Casternone

The Ceronda (Piedmontese: Sunder or Srunda) is a 22-kilometre (14 mi) long creek in the Metropolitan City of Turin, Piedmont region of northwestern Italy.

== Geography ==
It is formed from several streams that drain the northern slopes of Monte Colombano and converge near Varisella. Flowing from southwest to northeast, it reaches Fiano where it leaves the Alps and enters the Po plain turning towards south. After receiving from the right its main tributary, the Casternone, it crosses the Mandria nature park and finally flows into the river Stura di Lanzo in Venaria Reale.

== Other projects ==
Media related to Ceronda at Wikimedia Commons
