= Cirié =

- Comune
- Città di Cirié
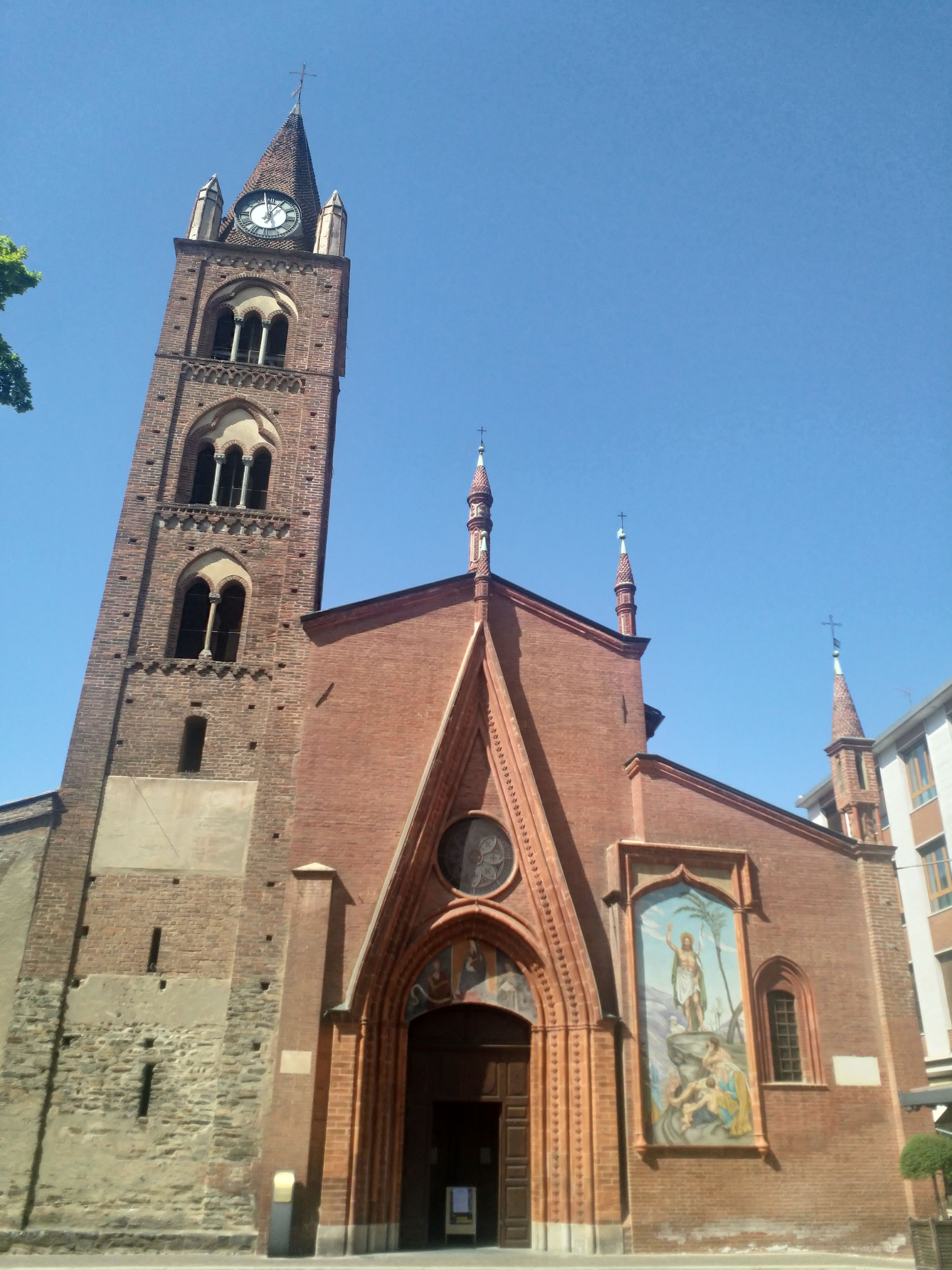
- Cirié: St. John Baptiste's cathedral (appr. year 1920).

- Coat of arms

- Location within Italy Location within Piedmont
- Coordinates: 45°14′N 07°36′E
- Country: Italy
- Region: Piedmont
- Metropolitan city: Turin (TO)
- Frazioni: Devesi, Vastalla

Government
  - Mayor: Loredana Devietti Goggia

Area
  - Total: 17.73 km^{2} (6.85 sq mi)
- Elevation: 344 m (1,129 ft)

Population (31 August 2021)
  - Total: 18,046
  - Density: 1,018/km^{2} (2,636/sq mi)
- Demonym: Ciriacesi
- Time zone: UTC+1 (CET)
  - Summer (DST): UTC+2 (CEST)
- Postal code: 10073
- Dialing code: 011
- Patron saint: St. Cyriacus
- Website: Official website

Cirié (Italian pronunciation: [tʃiˈrje]; Piedmontese: Ciriè or Siriè) is a comune (municipality) in the Metropolitan City of Turin in the Italian region Piedmont, located about 20 kilometres (12 mi) northwest of Turin.

Cirié borders the following municipalities: Nole, San Carlo Canavese, San Maurizio Canavese and Robassomero.

== Geography ==
Cirié, about 18 km northwest of Turin, is located at the end of the Lanzo valleys, close to a plateau called "Vauda", a Celtic origin term indicating a forest. The area is close to the Stura di Lanzo, a creek which flows west northwest of the city.

== History ==
The area around Cirié, since about the third century BC, was inhabited by the Salassi, a Celtic tribe settlement. Before Roman rule, according to Polybius, this area was covered in thick forests, with very few glades, some small villages and sparse tracks linking the settlements. In 143 BC, the Romans, led by consul Appius Claudius Pulcher (consul 143 BC), moved against the tribes living in the Orco and Dora Baltea valleys, to open a way towards Elvetia and Gaul. The Romans thought of a fast victory, but the Celtic tribes fought back with such a strength that the legions had initially to retreat. For this reason, the Romans set up several camps, for better control of roads and adjacent areas. Castra were set up in the current vicinity of Ivrea, Turin and Cirié, where the soldiers could easily control access to the Lanzo valleys.

The castrum stativum (permanent camp) in the Cirié area was called Castra Cerreti, deriving this name from the turkish oak (Quercus Cerri), an oak tree whose forests were abundant in the vicinity. In later years, it became known as Cerretum for short. The decumanus maximus (or via principalis), of the ancient castrum roughly coincides with via Vittorio Emanuele II, the current main street. After the complete defeat of the Salassi and the peace treaties, the castrum rapidly became a main business crossroads; and several houses, initially wooden then in bricks and stones, were built around the military camp.

When Christianity expanded in the Roman Empire, Cirié picked up Cyriacus (martyrized in Rome in 303) as patron saint, due to the similarity of his name with the ancient castrum denomination. The famous Il celebre Theatrum Statuum Sabaudiae (1682, a sort of guide to the Savoy territories) gives a long and detailed description of Cirié ("Septimo Taurinense ad Urbe lapide, Septentrionem versus, non longe ab Alpium Graiarum radicibus, occurrit Ciriacum Oppidum, insigne Marchionatus titulo, qui sub se S.Mauritium, Nolas & Robasomerium minora Oppida comprehendit") and cites the probable origin of the village name as being related to the martyr ("Pedemontanis dicitur Cirié, fortasse a peculiari Incolarum erga Divum Cyriacum Martyrem cultu, cujus festum s.Idus Augusti inibi summa celebritate recolitur"). The Roman presence in Cirié is testified to by several Roman coins, shards of vases and funerary stele (preserved in the San Martino church).

Starting from the Fall of the Western Roman Empire and the barbaric invasions, there is no further information on Cirié for almost a millennium: the next historical fact known is the occupation of Cirié's area by the Marquis of Montferrat in 1229. In 1296, Marguerite of Savoy married John I, Marquess of Montferrat, getting ruling rights over the territories of Caselle, Cirié and Lanzo. When her husband died prematurely, Marguerite moved into the great Castle of Cirié, a big fortress standing where nowadays is the piazza Castello. The coming of Marguerite to Cirié (1306) is celebrated with the Palio dei Borghi, a medieval festival held every two years with tournaments and games.

Marguerite began great works in the castle, which rapidly became one of the most renowned mansions of the area, with nobles visiting from all over Europe. The many servants coming along with the nobles were hosted by the citizens of Cirié and Marguerite issued "patenti", important acknowledgments of their service to the Marquess. Marguerite also cut taxes and commanded a weekly market to be held each Friday, a commercial venue which attracted many people and business from the neighbors. This market is still held today. The castle was destroyed during the French invasion of 1536 and the few remains were completely scattered about 1900 when the square was "modernized". Some friezes, the only remains of the once powerful castle, are now preserved in the San Martino church.

In 1576 the Savoy family exchanged the Cirié area for an access to the sea with the Doria Marquis of Genoa: Gian Gerolamo D'Oria established his residence in Cirié, starting the long dynasty (the D'Oria e del Maro di Cirié) which ruled the city until the last Marquis Emanuele D'Oria, who became the first mayor when Cirié, in force of a royal decree, is established as a "city" in 1905.

== Main sights ==
- San Giovanni Battista (known as the Duomo although it is not a cathedral church), dates from the 14th century, but the place has been dedicated to worship since the Romans settled in the area. Most probably a temple of the goddess Diana was erected in this very place. A series of Christian churches were then established on the site of the former temple. The current church, in a bright Piedmontese Gothic architecture, has three naves. It has been heavily restored in the late 1800s with some arguable Byzantine flavor by Edoardo Arborio Mella and the facade has been used a model for the church in the Borgo Medievale (Medieval village), a replica of medieval mountain castles of Piedmont and the Aosta Valley, built in Turin for the International Exhibition of 1884. The church has a four-floor bell tower with mullioned windows. The interior houses a Madonna del Popolo from Defendente Ferrari's workshop, a wonderful Byzantine-school crucifix (12th-13th centuries) and a triptych by Giuseppe Giovenone da Vercelli (1531); so beautiful that it is said that king Carlo Alberto offered 4000 lire to have it in the royal art collection (Sabauda Gallery), but the people of Cirié refused.
- Palazzo dei Marchesi D'Oria, built in the 17th century over a pre-existing building of the Provana family dating back to the 16th century. The restored palace had a vast park behind it, with a small lake and a tower where the ice which formed on the lake in winter was cut and stored to be used during the hottest months. When the D'Oria family was extinguished in the male line (beginning of 1900), the palace and the park were acquired by the healthy Remmert family. The palace became the seat of the city government ("municipio") while the park became a residential area (still known as the "Parco"). The House of Savoy had an apartment reserved inside the palace, when the king and his entourage came to Cirié for their hunting sessions.
- The Church of San Giuseppe was built as a votive offering during the 1630−31 plague. The church is in a delicate piedmontese Baroque architecture and has a beautiful altarpiece attributed to Defendente Ferrari.
- The Chiesa di San Martino (di Liramo), the oldest church of Cirié, in a Romanesque style, was probably built in the early 10th century. Several times restored, it now has two small naves with semi-circular apses and a massive seven floor bell tower with mullioned windows. Most of the church is built with river stones and bricks. There are several partly remaining frescoes of different times. One remarkable part of Adam and Eve after the original sin on the arch of the major apse is partly covered by remains of a scene from a probable Last Judgement. A badly damaged Romanesque Christ Pantocrator is on the major apse. In the southern nave, there are some remains of frescoes devoted to the Virgin Mary as well as a Saint Martin of Tours, to whom the church is dedicated, probably dating from around the 14th century. The church also preserves some Roman tombstones.

== Sources ==
- Sismonda, Angelo Notizie storiche di Cirié, 1924, re-printed by a Bottega d'Erasmo, 1972 (Italian only).
