= ToBike =

Bicycle-sharing system in Turin, Italy

[TO]Bike
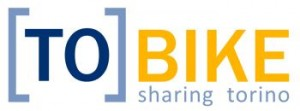

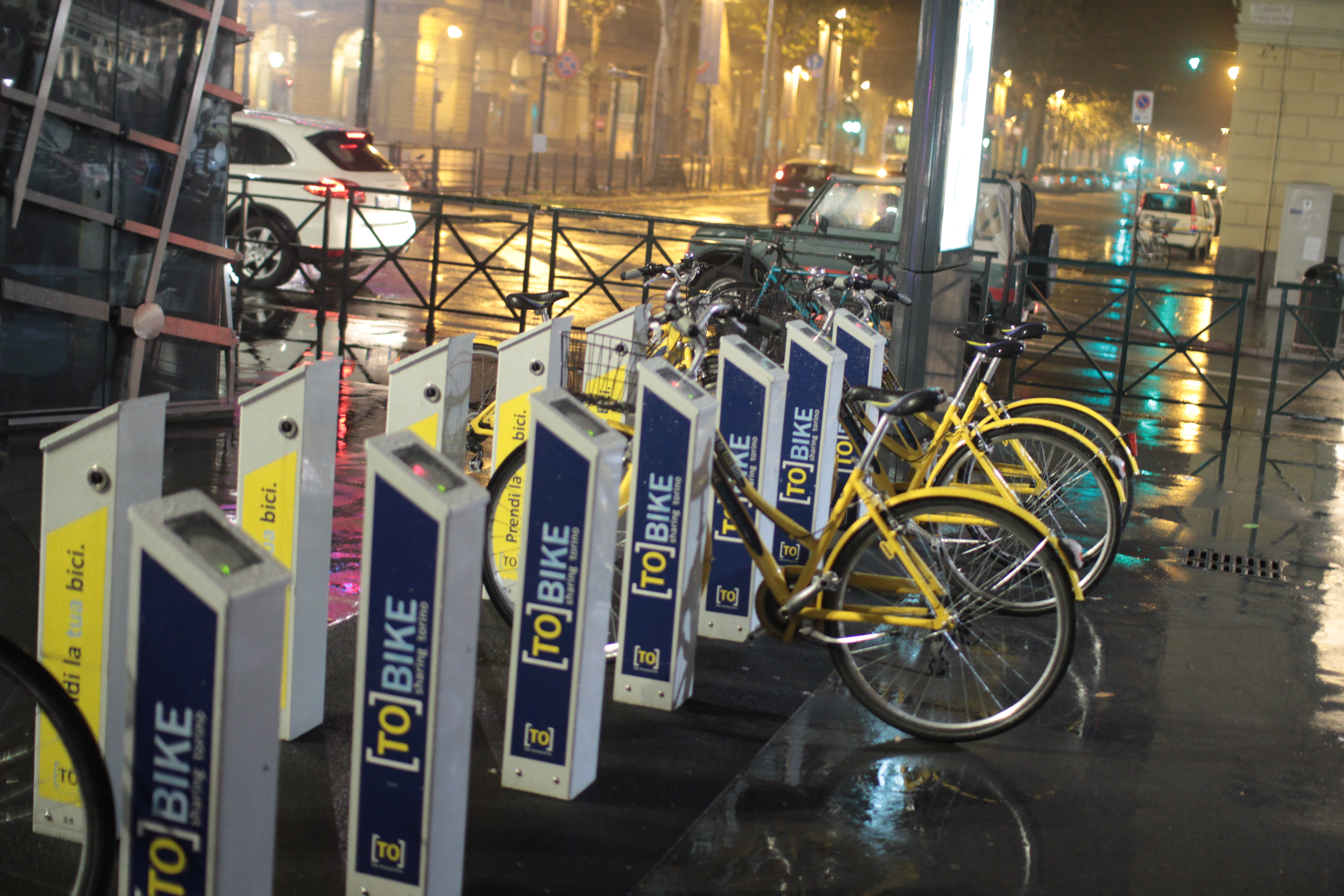

Overview
- Locale: Turin, Italy
- Transit type: Bicycle-sharing system
- Number of stations: 128 active (+76 planned & confirmed)
- Website: tobike.it

Operation
- Began operation: 5 June 2010; 16 years ago
- Ended operation: 13 February 2023; 3 years ago
- Operators: ToBike, Comunicare s.p.a.
- Number of vehicles: 600 active (1300 planned & confirmed)

[TO]Bike was the bicycle-sharing system of the city of Turin. Planned between 2008 and 2009, it was operational from 2010 to 2023.

== Service ==
The service was operational 24 hours a day every day of the year. It was based on the Bicincittà system: every station was formed from 8 to 20 terminals (or more). Each terminal was in a small metallic column with an RFID reader interface on top. This included two LEDs: a green one for normal operation ad a red one to indicate malfunction or errors while reading users' cards. A complementary piezo speaker acted with the LEDs to indicate the correct or incorrect reading of the user's code.

The user approached the terminal with their personal card, which mechanically releases the bike. From that moment the bike is available for a period of 30 minutes. All the terminals are connected together to create a network which allowed the user and service administration to locate the stations where the bike has been withdrawn (every bike is equipped with its own RFID chip). The service was completed by a web platform, from which the user could check their credit, renew their subscription and keep track of all the trips made and the number of bikes used.

The system was also linked with the BiciInComune services, operational in the near cities of Alpignano, Druento, Rivoli, Collegno, Grugliasco and Venaria Reale.

== Bikes ==
The bikes adopted by the ToBike services were low-profile women's model citybikes. The livery was inspired by the official colors of the city with yellow main frame and blue large stickers for the ToBike logo. Equipment included a 7-speed chain transmission, front and rear lights powered by a dynamo installed on the front wheel hub, and a metallic basket on the handlebar and a bell. On the left side of the junction between the handlebar and frame was the cylindrical locking joint that contains the identifying RFID chip and allows locking it to the terminal. The wheels were made of aluminium alloy on which reinforced tires are mounted.

== Rates ==
The annual cost of the service was of €25, with a preventive €5 addition in order to create a credit on the user's account. In case the user exceeded from the 30' canonic time for a single use of a bike, the service applied fines and automatically scaled sums from that credit. A €5 global insurance against damages to third parties was also offered optionally. The offer also included daily and weekly subscriptions.

== Stations and further development ==
ToBike system consists of a growing number of bikes and 176 stations among operational, under construction ones and planned ones. Joining the 28 stations of Alpignano, Druento, Rivoli, Collegno, Grugliasco and Venaria Reale the number of stations reached 204.

ToBike ceased operations in February 2023.

== See also ==
- List of bicycle-sharing systems
