= Robassomero =

- Comune
- Comune di Robassomero
- Location within Italy Location within Piedmont
- Coordinates: 45°12′N 7°34′E
- Country: Italy
- Region: Piedmont
- Metropolitan city: Turin (TO)

Government
  - Mayor: Antonio Massa

Area
  - Total: 8.58 km^{2} (3.31 sq mi)
- Elevation: 360 m (1,180 ft)

Population (1-1-2017)
  - Total: 3,093
  - Density: 360/km^{2} (934/sq mi)
- Demonym: Robassomerese(i)
- Time zone: UTC+1 (CET)
  - Summer (DST): UTC+2 (CEST)
- Postal code: 10070
- Dialing code: 011
- Website: Official website

Robassomero is a comune (municipality) in the Metropolitan City of Turin in the Italian region Piedmont, located about 20 kilometres (12 mi) northwest of Turin. As of 1-1-2017, it had a population of 3,093 and an area of 8.58 square kilometres (3.31 mi^{2}).

Robassomero borders the following municipalities: Nole, Cirié, Fiano, San Maurizio Canavese, Caselle Torinese, Druento, and Venaria Reale.

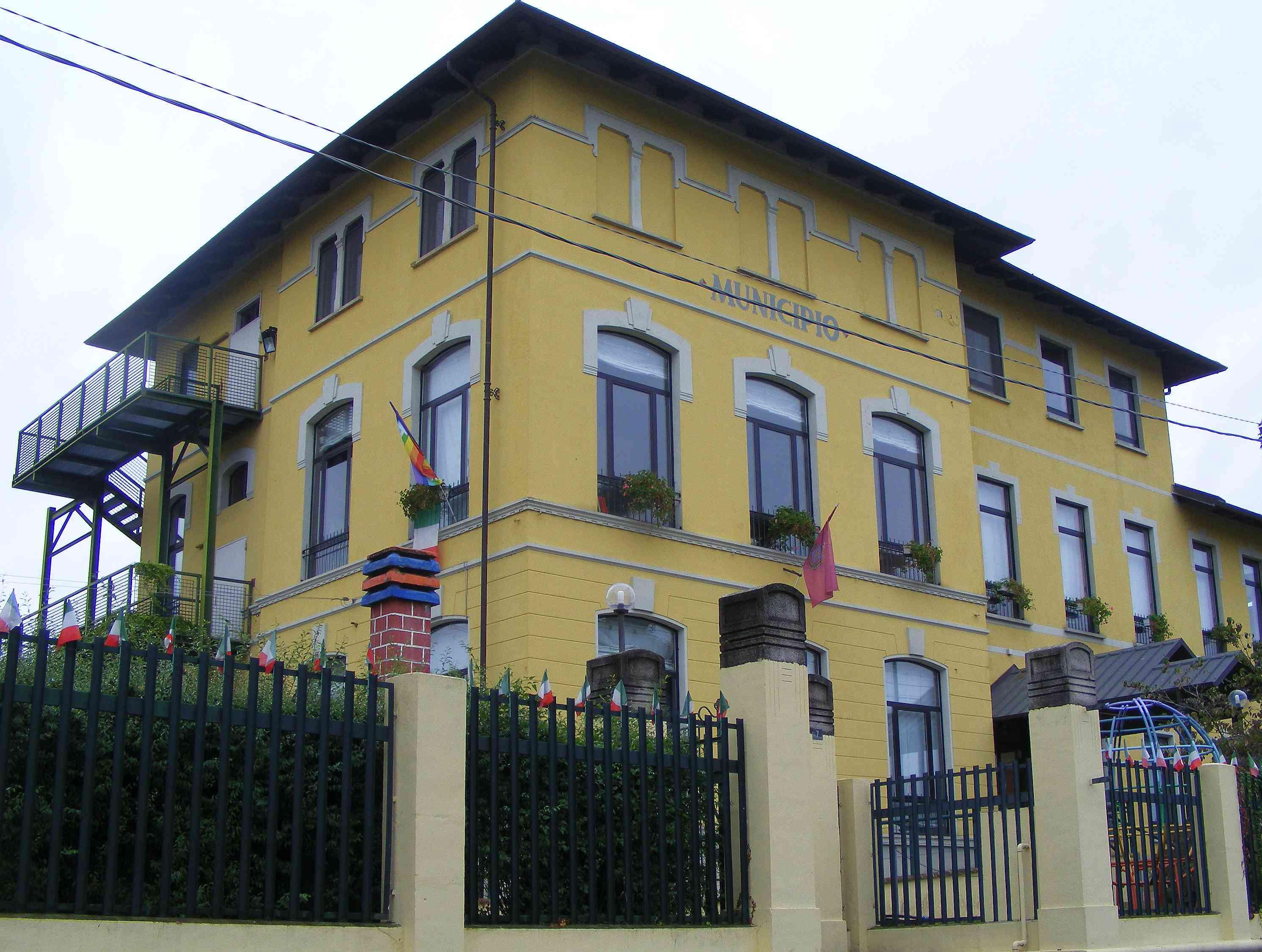
Robassomero

Robassomero is the first nuclear-free municipality (1981): the first in Italy. On 17 November 1981 the City Council approved a resolution from the highly symbolic Robassomero stated that "nuclear-free zone" or area where it is forbidden to install nuclear weapons and nuclear power plants. This is for promoting peace among peoples, to use the resources of the planet to combat world hunger and protect the environment using renewable energy as an alternative to nuclear power. Since then, he started a broad movement across Italy against war and against nuclear danger that led to the denuclearization of many communities and cities.

== Demographic evolution ==
Historical population

Year	Pop.	±%
1861	561	—
1871	609	+8.6%
1881	669	+9.9%
1901	786	+17.5%
1911	787	+0.1%

Year	Pop.	±%
1921	777	−1.3%
1931	814	+4.8%
1936	809	−0.6%
1951	915	+13.1%
1961	918	+0.3%

Year	Pop.	±%
1971	1,725	+87.9%
1981	2,734	+58.5%
1991	2,911	+6.5%
2001	3,028	+4.0%

Source: Data from ISTAT
