= Fiano, Piedmont =

Fiano
- Comune
- Comune di Fiano
- Location within Italy Location within Piedmont
- Coordinates: 45°13′N 7°31′E
- Country: Italy
- Region: Piedmont
- Metropolitan city: Turin (TO)
- Frazioni: Grange, Gerbidi, San Firmino

Government
  - Mayor: Guglielmo Filippini

Area
  - Total: 12.04 km^{2} (4.65 sq mi)
- Elevation: 430 m (1,410 ft)

Population (1-1-2017)
  - Total: 2,698
  - Density: 224.1/km^{2} (580.4/sq mi)
- Demonym: Fianese(i)
- Time zone: UTC+1 (CET)
  - Summer (DST): UTC+2 (CEST)
- Postal code: 10070
- Dialing code: 011
- Website: Official website

Fiano is a comune (municipality) in the Metropolitan City of Turin in the Italian region Piedmont, located about 20 kilometres (12 mi) northwest of Turin.

Fiano borders the following municipalities: Nole, Germagnano, Cafasse, Villanova Canavese, Vallo Torinese, Varisella, Robassomero, La Cassa, and Druento.

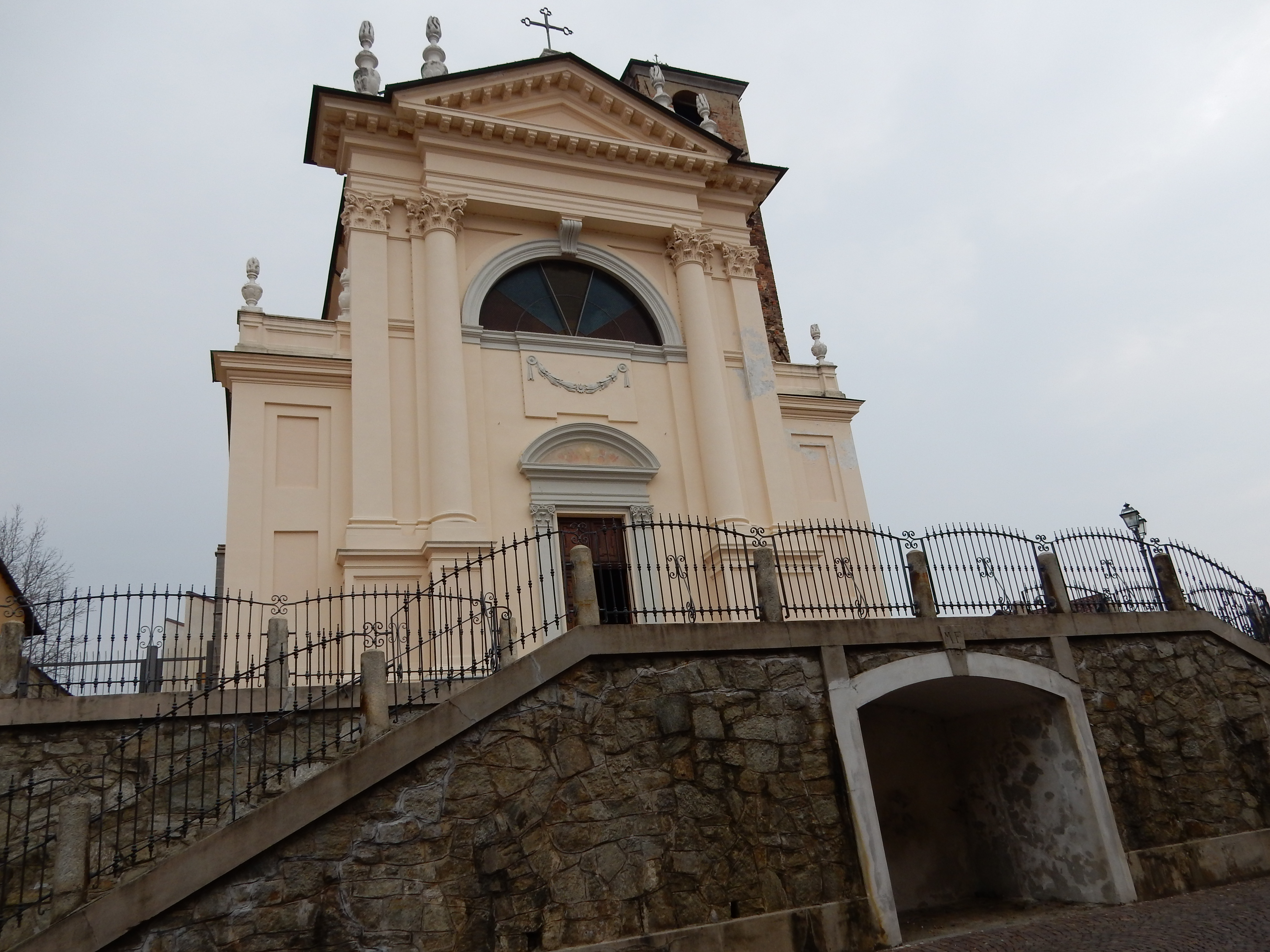
Parish church of San Desiderio Martire, Fiano.
