= San Maurizio Canavese =

- Comune
- Comune di San Maurizio Canavese
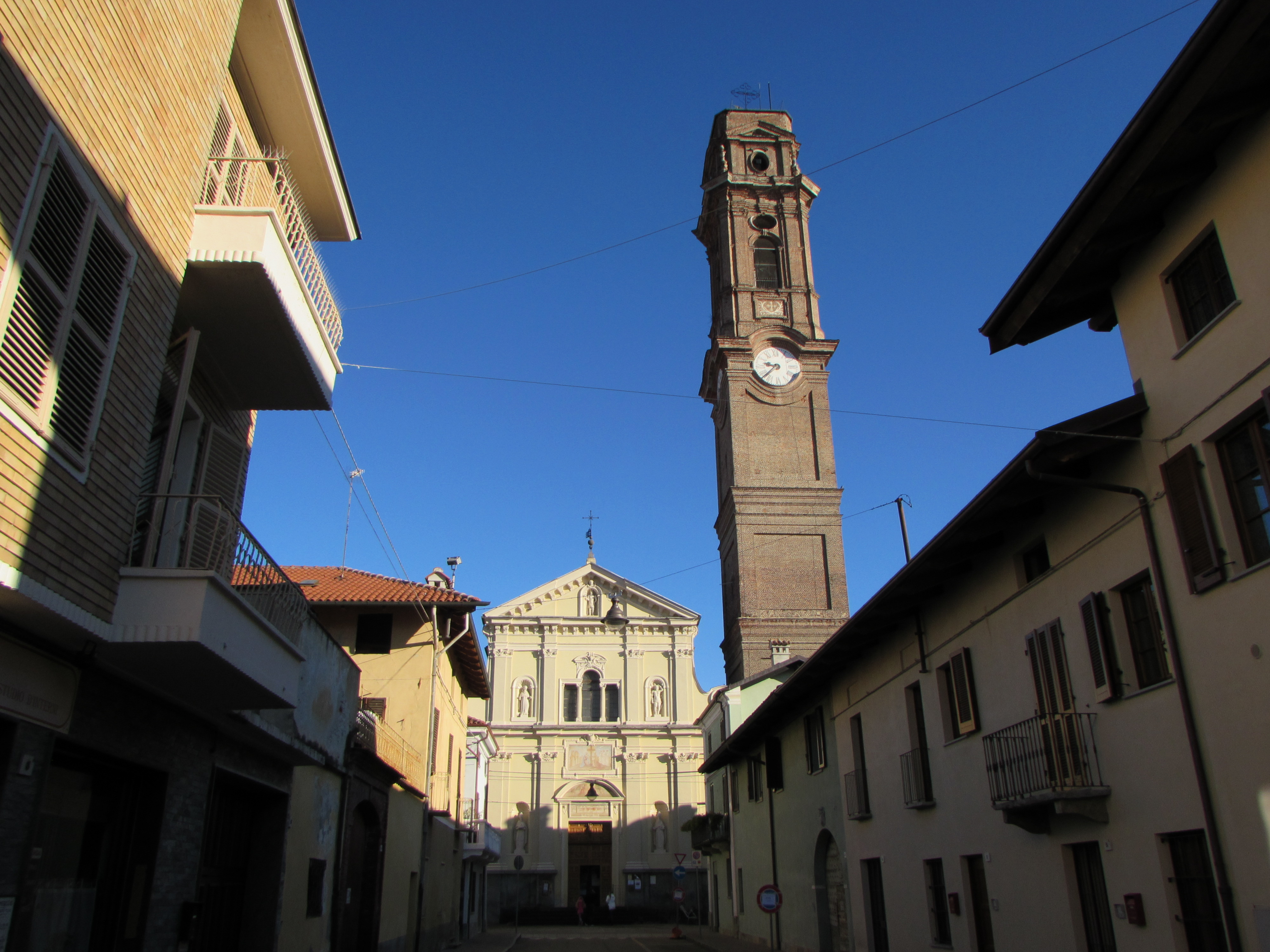
- Parish church.

- Location within Italy Location within Piedmont
- Coordinates: 45°13′N 7°38′E
- Country: Italy
- Region: Piedmont
- Metropolitan city: Turin (TO)
- Frazioni: Ceretta, Malanghero, Bonini, Favorita, Maffei, Novaire, Santa Lucia, Sorti

Government
  - Mayor: Michelangelo Picat Re

Area
  - Total: 17.34 km^{2} (6.70 sq mi)
- Elevation: 317 m (1,040 ft)

Population (1 January 2022)
  - Total: 10,224
  - Density: 589.6/km^{2} (1,527/sq mi)
- Demonym: Sanmauriziese(i)
- Time zone: UTC+1 (CET)
  - Summer (DST): UTC+2 (CEST)
- Postal code: 10077
- Dialing code: 011
- Patron saint: Maurice
- Saint day: September 22
- Website: Official website

San Maurizio Canavese is a comune (municipality) in the Metropolitan City of Turin in the Italian region Piedmont, located about 15 kilometres (9 mi) northwest of Turin.

San Maurizio Canavese borders the following municipalities: San Carlo Canavese, San Francesco al Campo, Cirié, Leinì, Robassomero and Caselle Torinese.

The company Alenia Aeronautica has an office on the property of Turin Caselle Airport and in S. Maurizio Canavese.

== History ==
In pre-Roman times the area was inhabited by Celt-Ligurian tribes. In the Middle Ages, starting from the 13th century, it was part of the lands of the Marquisses of Montferrat.

During the Unification of Italy, it was, together with Fenestrelle, a location for the imprisonment of rebels from the former Kingdom of Two Sicilies. In the late course of World War II, Carlo Angela, father of TV science host Piero Angela and then director of the clinic for mental diseases "Villa Turina Amione" in San Maurizio, gave shelter to several antifascist opposers and Jews fleeing from German and RSI soldiers.

== Main sights ==
- Parish church of San Maurizio Martire
- Church of San Rocco

== Notable people ==
- Giovanni Brunero (1895-1934), cyclist

== Twin towns ==
- General Cabrera, Argentina
