= Pietra Alta =

Glacial erratic in Italy

Pietra Alta Pera Aota (Piedmontese)
- Glacial erratic
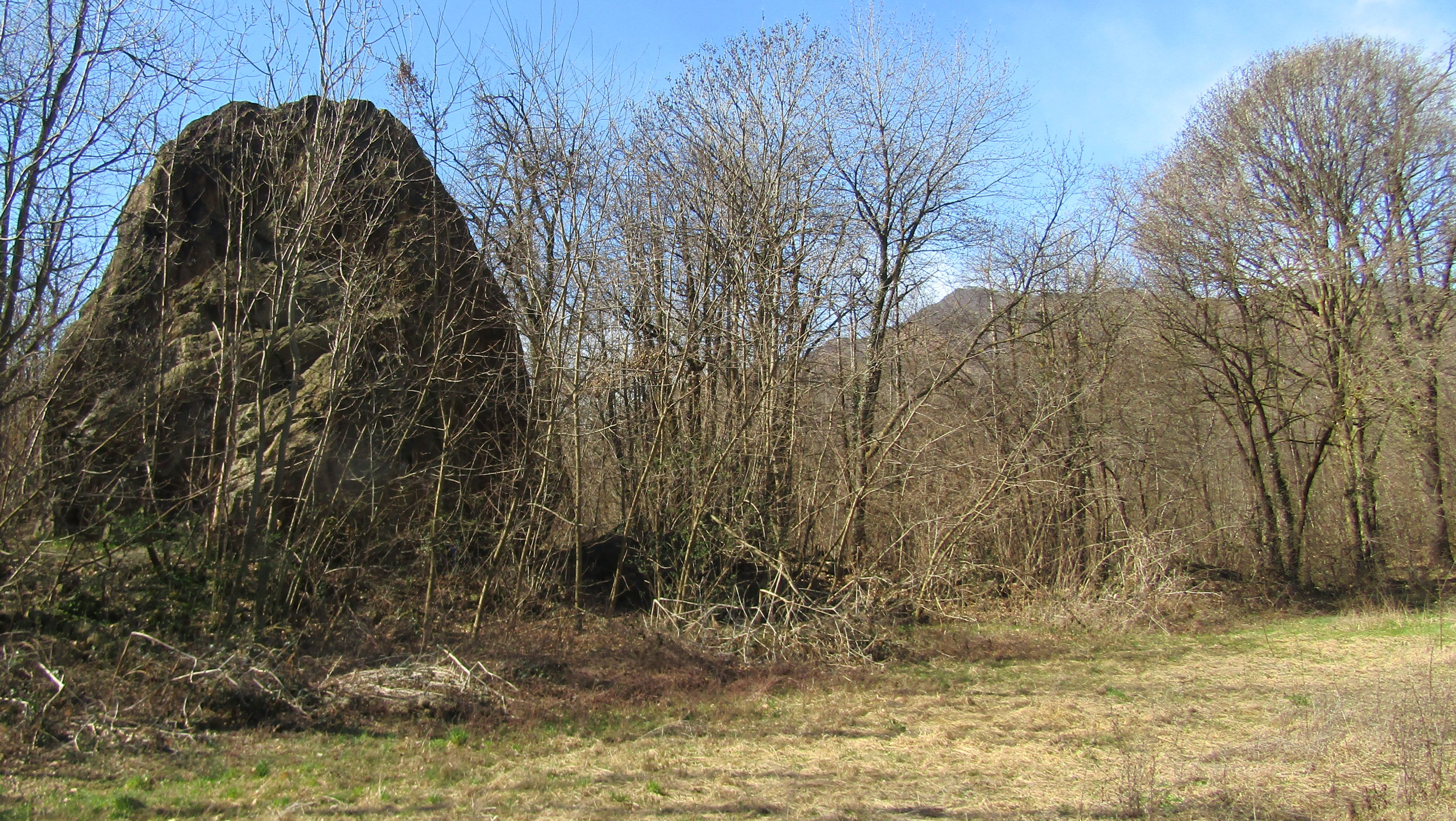
- The Pietra Alta, in the background Monte Musinè

- Location within Italy
- Coordinates: 45.11242°N 7.49547°E
- Location: Near Caselette, (TO)
- Geology: Glacial erratic
- Elevation: 368 m (1,207 ft)

The Pietra Alta (in piedmontese: Pera Aota or Peraota, meaning High Stone) is a glacial erratic in the comune of Caselette (TO, Italy), relevant for its size and its isolated location.

== Features ==
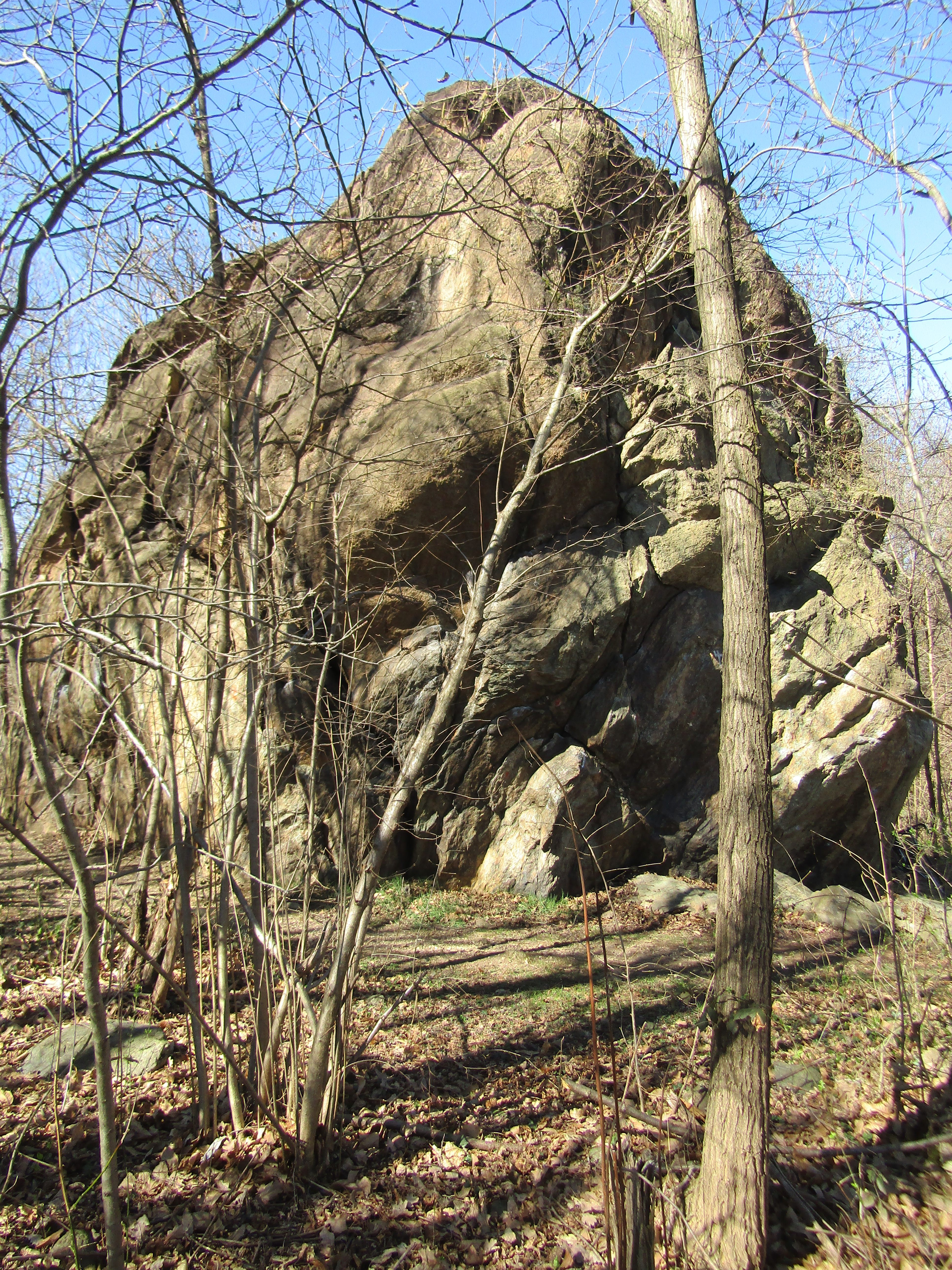
South view

The erratic is a massive boulder with a pyramidal shape, emerging some 10 metres from the ground level and with a circumference of about 50 metres. Its elevation is 368 m. It stands in a woody and almost plain spot close to the border between Caselette and Alpignano, not faraway from the small Lake of Caselette. The place is still of a good environmental quality, although almost encircled by industrial and residential areas.

== Geology ==
The Pietra Alta belongs to the Morainic amphitheater of Rivoli-Avigliana, and in particular to the moraine left by the Riss glaciation. It was transported to its present location by the huge glacier which occupied the Susa Valley.

Its height on the ground level is remarkable compared to other glacial erratics of Piedmont. Pietra Alta, unlike other boulders mostly covered by the ground, is almost fully exposed. It consists of a huge block of serpentinite with a volume of 2.600 cubic metres. On its surface can be detected rinds similar to the so-called desert varnishes, considered by geologist an indicator of a semi-arid climate.

== Uses ==
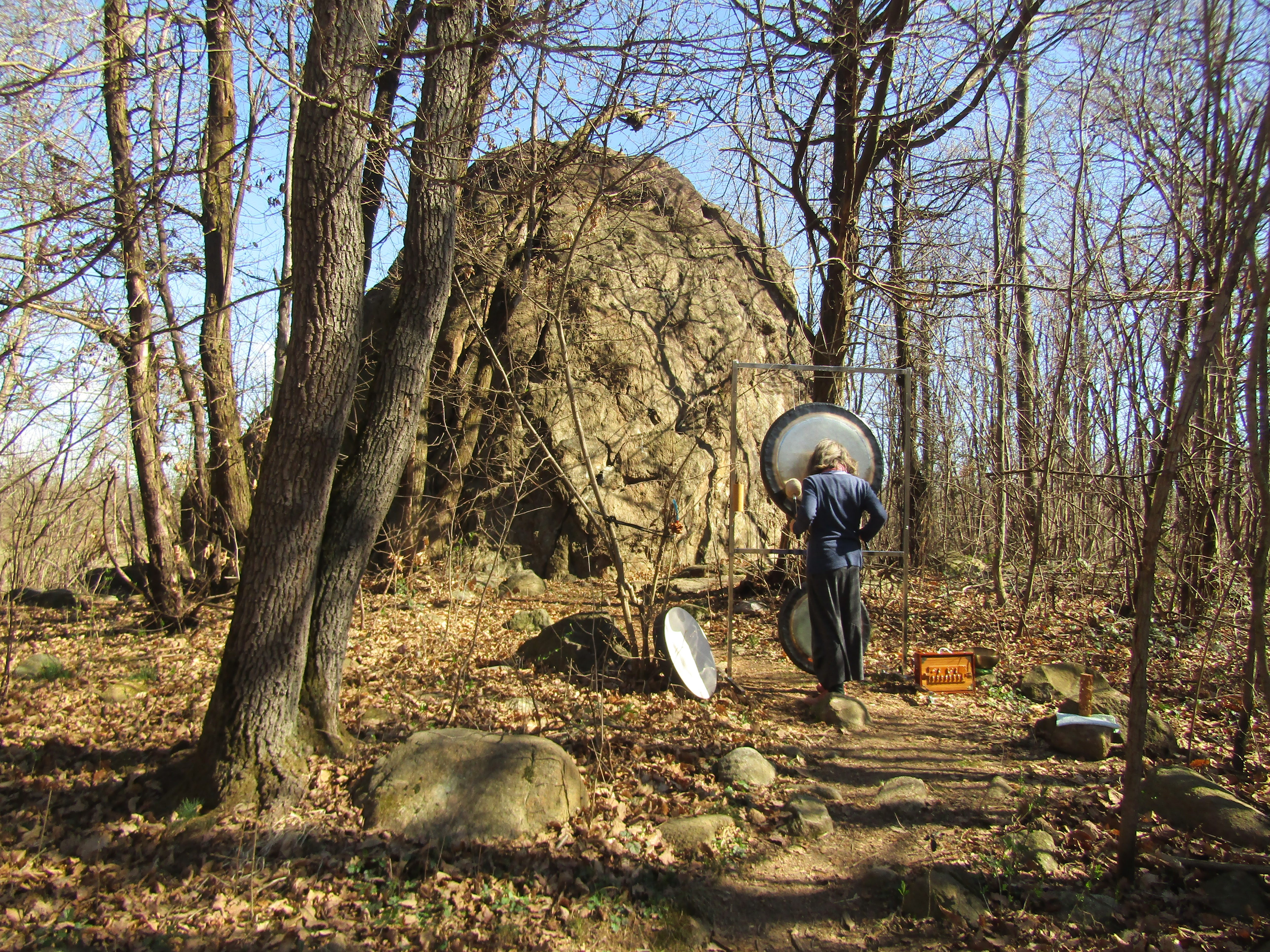
Meditazione sonora (sonic meditation) performed with gongs close to the boulder

On the boulder there are a lot of climbing routes, and its sides are equipped with bolts and pitons to protect the climbers. Many of these routes, some of them very engaging, were described at the beginning of the 1980s by the alpinist Gian Carlo Grassi in his book Sassismo spazio per la fantasia: arrampicate sui massi erratici della Valle di Susa. The environment surrounding the Pietra Alta is considered very suggestive; the boulder can be easily reached on foot from Caselette following Via Pietra Alta, a small asphalted lane which continues with a pedestrian dirt road.

== See also ==
- List of individual rocks
