= La Mandria Regional Park =

Park in Venaria Reale, Italy

Coordinates: 45°08′07″N 7°37′31″E

Parco naturale La Mandria
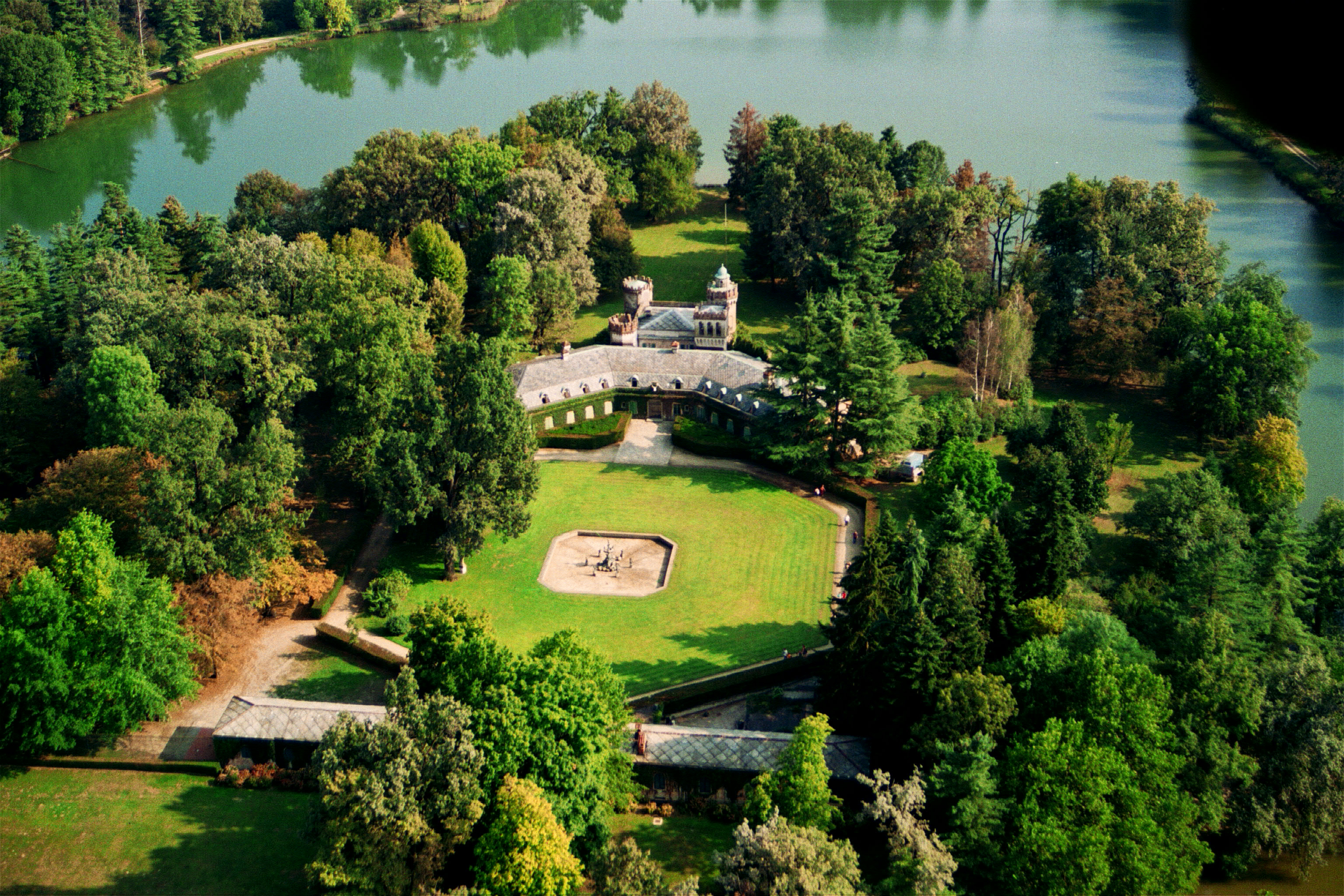
- Location: Piedmont
- Nearest city: Turin
- Area: 6,571.00 ha
- Established: 1978
- Governing body: Ente di gestione delle aree protette dei Parchi Reali

La Mandria Regional Park is a park in the Comune of Venaria Reale and Druento, near Turin, northern Italy. Founded in 1978 by the regional council of Piedmont, it occupies a wide area between the Stura di Lanzo torrent and the north-western part of Turin and Venaria.

It is the second largest enclosed park in Europe, with a surface of some 3,000 hectares, bounded by a 30 km long wall built in the mid-19th century by Victor Emmanuel II, who had moved to the castle here (the Borgo Castello) the residence of his morganatic wife, Rosa Vercellana. The park included one of the last relics of the large forest which once covered the whole Po Plain. Fauna includes wild boars and deer. The park has also breeds of horse races which are considered in risk of extinction. There are many accesses to the park: the gate of the avenue Bella Rosina, Fiano and the gates of Robassomero: Oslera Cascina, Cascina La Falchetta and Royal Park I Roveri, and of course those from Turin.

== Borgo Castello ==
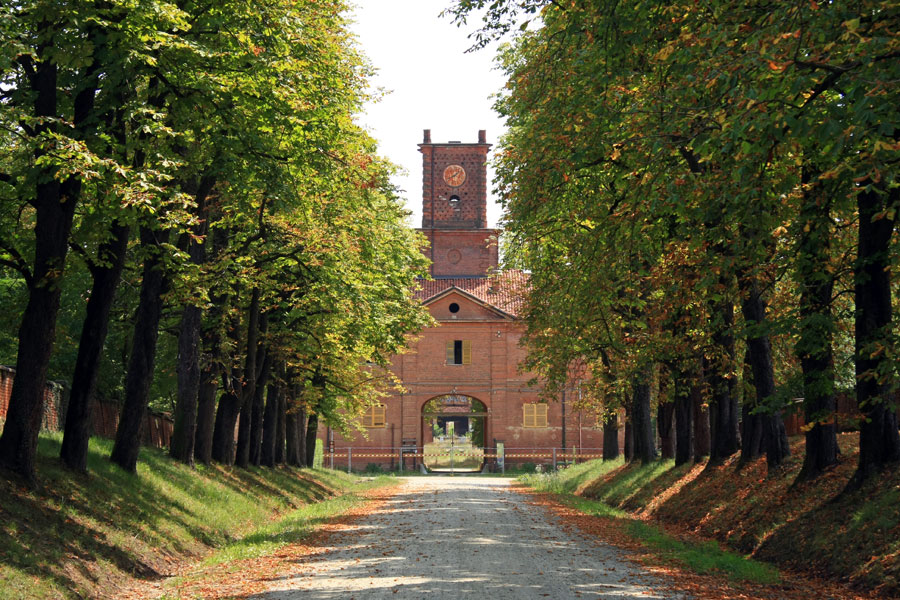
Mandria castle

The existence of a building in the wood is documented since the 18th century, when Victor Amadeus II built here the stables of the nearby Royal Palace of Venaria, within a royal hunting reserve active since the 16th century.

Filippo Juvarra worked at the castle in the 1720s. In 1860 Victor Emmanuel ordered the enlargement of the village (designers included Ernesto Melano), turning it into a castle with a surface of 35,000 m^{2}. The new structure had a rectangular shape measuring 280 x 100 m with three internal courtyards. The King wanted here a private residence (not belonging to the royal estates) to live with his morganatic wife, Rosa Vercellana. An apartment was built for her family by Domenico Ferri. In 1861 the structure was expanded with the "Villa of the Lakes", a neo-Gothic wing and a fountain of a sea horse fighting a triton by Vincenzo Vela. All the edifices, similarly to the Palazzo Carignano in Turin, are in brickwork.

In 1997, the castle was placed on the UNESCO World Heritage Site list along with 13 other residences of the House of Savoy.

In the late 19th century La Mandria and its buildings were sold to the Medici del Vascello family. After World War II, a testing track owned by FIAT, a golf court and a residential center were added. It became a regional estate in 1976.

== Sources ==
- Francesco Pernice, ed. (2008). L'Appartamento di Vittorio Emanuele II. Turin: Celid.
- Luca Avataneo, ed. (2013). Il Castello de La Mandria. Gli Appartamenti Reali. Turin: Allemandi.
- Luca Avataneo, ed. (2017). Il Castello de La Mandria e l'Appartamento di Vittorio Emanuele II. Turin: Allemandi.
