= Venaria Reale =

Italian municipality in the Metropolitan City of Turin, Piedmont

- Comune
- Città di Venaria Reale
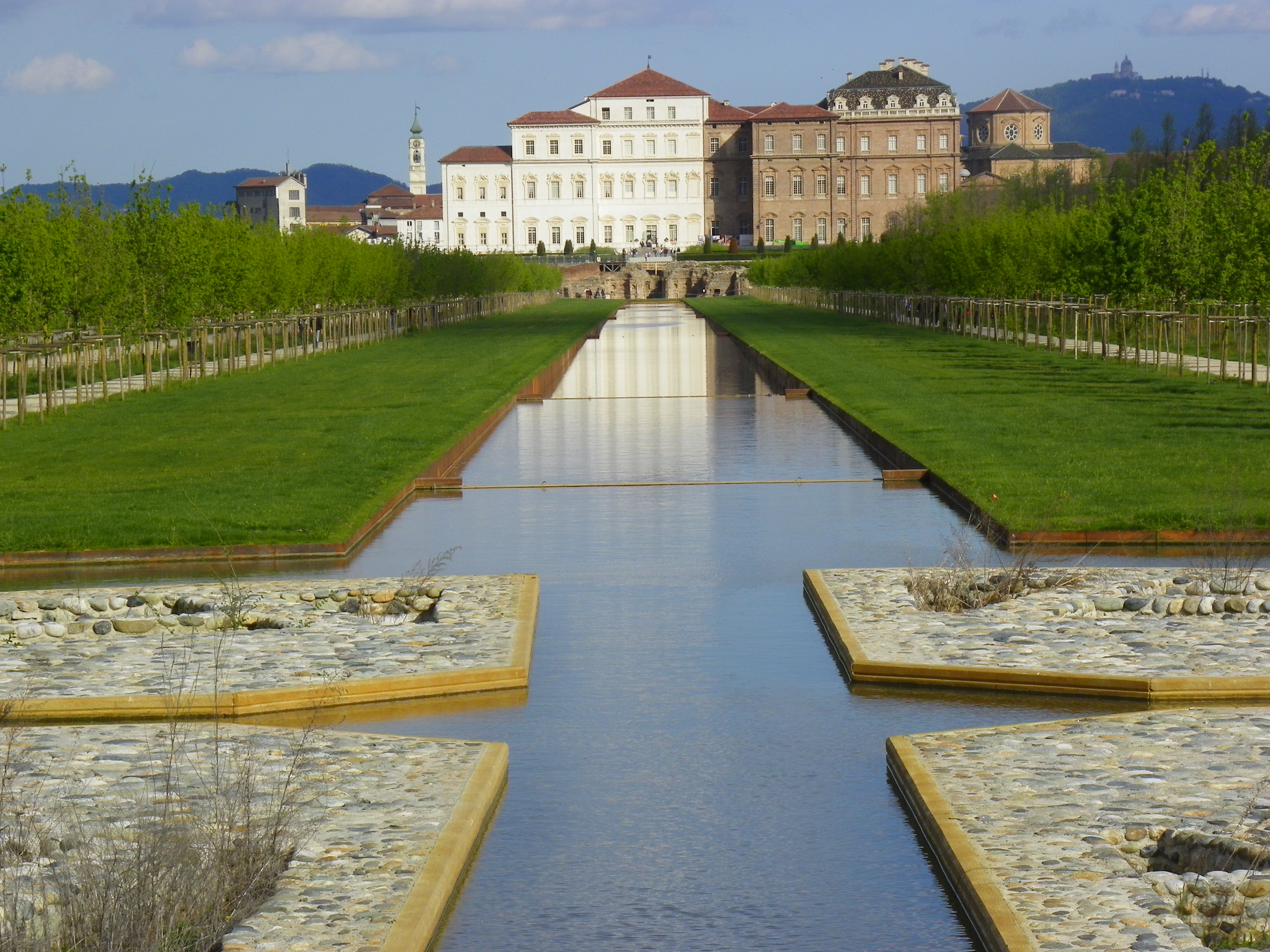
- Royal Palace of Venaria

- Coat of arms

- Location within Italy Location within Piedmont
- Coordinates: 45°7′N 7°38′E
- Country: Italy
- Region: Piedmont
- Metropolitan city: Turin (TO)
- Frazioni: Altessano, La Mandria

Government
  - Mayor: Giuseppe Catania (PD)

Area
  - Total: 20.3 km^{2} (7.8 sq mi)
- Elevation: 262 m (860 ft)

Population (30 September 2010)
  - Total: 34,838
  - Density: 1,720/km^{2} (4,440/sq mi)
- Demonym: Venariesi
- Time zone: UTC+1 (CET)
  - Summer (DST): UTC+2 (CEST)
- Postal code: 10078
- Dialing code: 011
- Website: Official website

Venaria Reale (Piedmontese: La Venerìa) is a comune (municipality) in the Metropolitan City of Turin in the Italian region Piedmont, located about 8 kilometres (5 mi) northwest of Turin. Venaria Reale borders the municipalities of Robassomero, Caselle Torinese, Druento, Borgaro Torinese, Turin, Pianezza, and Collegno.

Founded in Roman times and previously known as Altessano (Autsan in the Piedmontese language), it was divided into Altessano Superiore and Altessano Inferiore in the sixteenth century. The upper town was chosen by the House of Savoy as a location for a hunting palace, and its modern name is derived from the Latin for hunting, ars venatoria.

Turin and Venaria Reale are the only Piedmontese municipalities with more than one Savoy residence: the seventeenth century Royal Palace of Venaria (included in the UNESCO Heritage List in 1997) and the nineteenth-century royal apartments of Borgo Castello, located in La Mandria Regional Park are in Venaria Reale. The historical center of the commune was built by Amedeo di Castellamonte in 1667–1690 as a scenic background for the Royal Palace

Michele Lessona, an illustrious scientist and decorated Senatore del Regno, was a citizen of Venaria Reale in the 19th Century.

== Twin towns – sister cities ==
Venaria Reale is twinned with:

- Brașov, Romania
