= Carlo Angela =

Italian doctor (1875–1949)

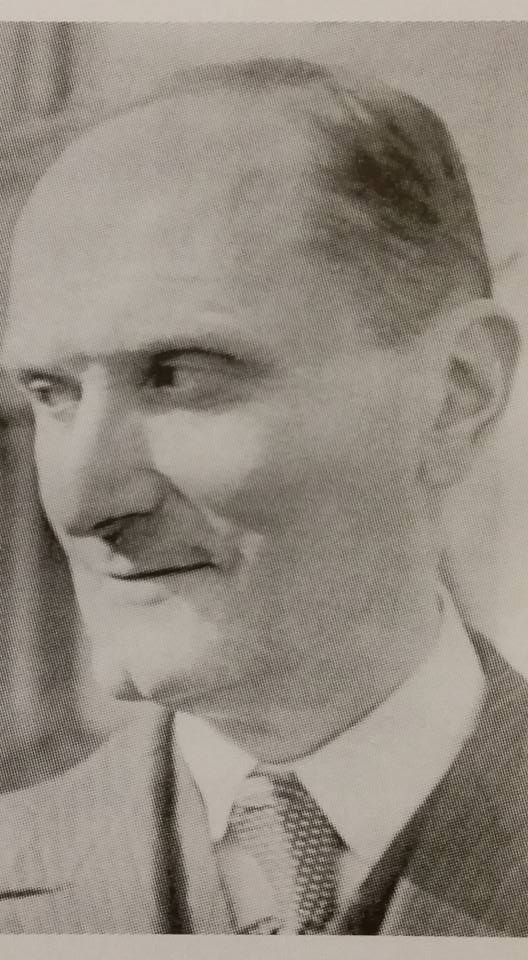

Carlo Angela (9 January 1875 – 3 June 1949) was an Italian doctor, who has been recognized as a "Righteous Among the Nations" for his efforts during World War II in saving Jewish lives. He is the father of TV journalist and science writer Piero Angela and grandfather of Alberto Angela.

== Early life ==
Angela was born a Olcenengo, Province of Vercelli.

He graduated with a degree in medicine in 1899 at the University of Turin. In Paris he attended the Neuropsychiatry courses held by Babinski. During World War I he was an officer of the Italian Red Cross at the "Vittorio Emanuele III" Territorial Hospital of Turin.

== Political activity ==
He joined politics after World War I, by joining the Democrazia Sociale movement, a political movement born from the ashes of the Partito Radicale Storico. Within the party there were many contradictions: together with left-wing deputies there were others who became ministers in the first government run by Mussolini, formed after the march on Rome. Then Angela left the party and allied with the reformist Socialists led by Ivanoe Bonomi, whom he ran with at the elections of 6 April 1924, without being elected.

After the murder of Giacomo Matteotti, in June 1924, Carlo Angela openly blamed the fascists from the pages of the weekly paper Tempi Nuovi.

== Humanitarian actions ==
The government's reaction to this article was to set the newspaper's office on fire and Angela fled to San Maurizio Canavese. There, he became health director of the clinic for mental diseases "Villa Turina Amione". It was there that Angela offered a safe haven to numerous antifascists and Jews during the German Occupation and the Repubblica Sociale Italiana, by forging the medical cards to justify their stay inside the clinics. He diagnosed patients incorrectly and changed names or nationalities. In his rescue he was helped by Vice-Director dr. Brun, by sister Tecla and by the nurses Fiore De Stefanis, Carlo and Sante Simionato. As suspected by the fascist police, Mr. Angela was summoned and interrogated in Turin and he also ran the risk of being shot during a retaliation.

== After World War II ==
During the Liberation, Carlo Angela was appointed mayor of San Maurizio Canavese. Afterwards he ran for the first democratic elections after longer than twenty years, in the same list as Norberto Bobbio, Massimo Mila and Ada Gobetti Marchesini.

He also became the President of the Molinette hospital in Turin.

He was initiated in Freemasonry since 1905, where he was conferred of the 33 degree of the Scottish Rite. After the end of the Second World War, he became Grand Master of the Lodge "Propaganda" of Turin until his death, and President of the Grand Master Council of the same city.

He died in 1949. On 8 June it was afforded the related ritual in the Temple of "Propaganda".

== Medal of "Righteous among the Nations" ==
The necessary requirements for a man to be acknowledged as a "Righteous" are three: saving Jews, doing so under the threat of a serious life risk, and never getting any reward for this.

The deeds of Angela remained unknown for more than 25 years because of his family's reserve, and were only revealed in 1995, when Anna Segre decided to publish the diary of her father Renzo, written during the time when he had escaped the extermination camps together with his wife Nella in the clinic "Villa Turina Amione"

Based on the evidence and the testimonies collected and presented to it, on 29 August 2001 an Israeli committee awarded Professor Angela the Medal as a Righteous among the Nations and inserted his name into the Garden of the Righteous at the Yad Vashem museum in Jerusalem: the awarding ceremony took place in San Maurizio Canavese on 25 April 2002. The Adviser of the Israeli Embassy in Rome, Tibor Schlosser, in the name of the world's Jewish community as a whole, assigned the award to Sandra and Piero, Carlo Angela's children.

Since 3 June 2000, a street holds the name of Carlo Angela in San Maurizio Canavese and a plaque was put up over entrance of the Town Hall.

== Sources ==
- Segre, Renzo (1995). Venti mesi. Palermo: Sellerio.
- Gutman, Israel; Bracha Rivlin; Liliana Picciotto (2006). I giusti d'Italia: i non ebrei che salvarono gli ebrei, 1943-45. Milan: Mondadori. pp. 18–19.
- Liguori, Pier Francesco (1999). Percorsi della memoria - Storia della Croce Rossa a Torino - Parte I: 1864-1956. Editrice Morra. pp. 51–52.
- Pacifici Noja, Ugo G. and Silvia (2010). Il cacciatore di giusti: storie di non-ebrei che salvarono i figli di Israele dalla Shoah. Cantalupa Torinese: Effatà.
