= Monte Musinè =

Mountain in Italy

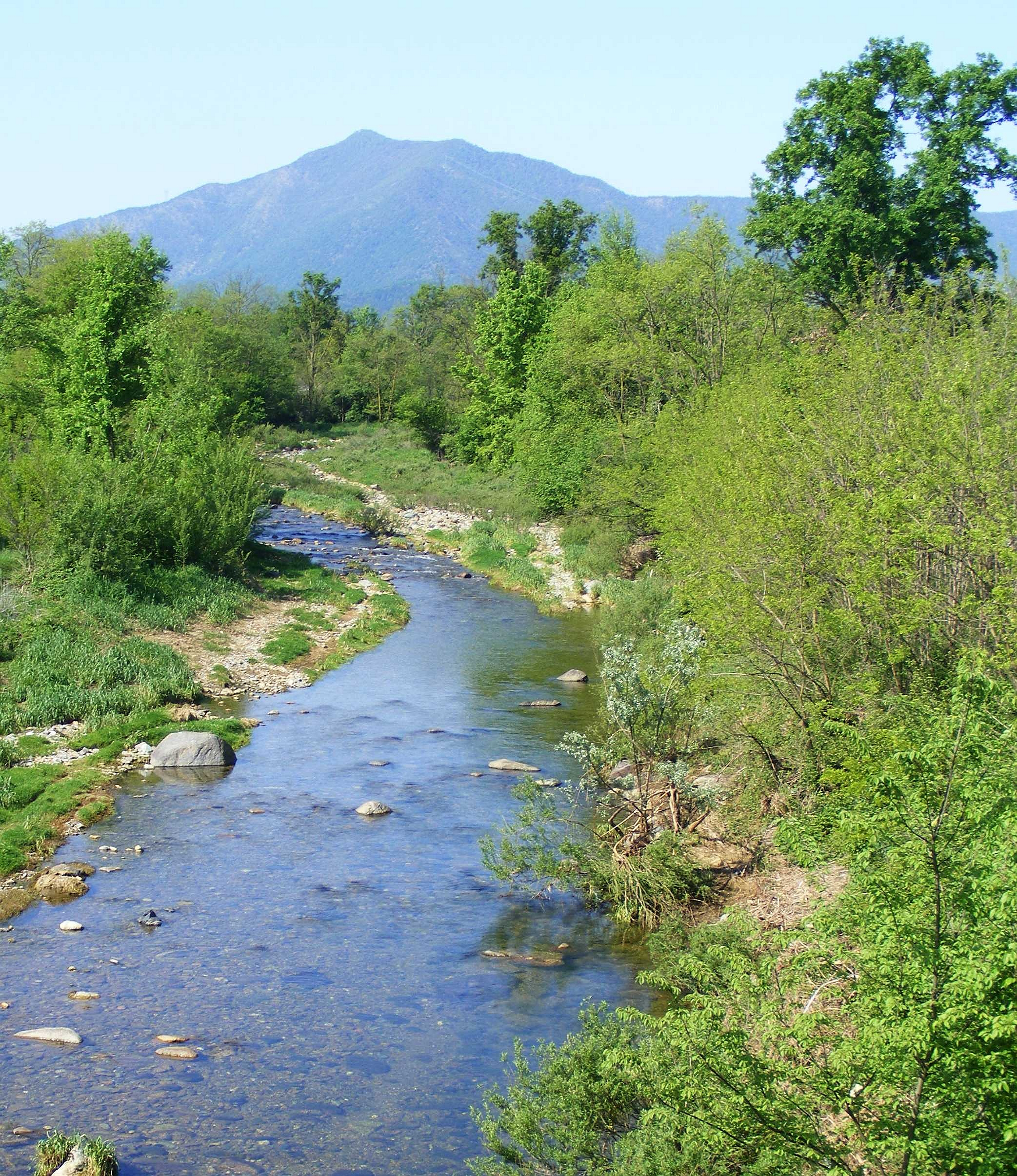
- The mountain seen from Casternone (San Gillio)

Highest point
- Elevation: 1,150 m (3,770 ft)
- Prominence: 202 m (663 ft)
- Isolation: 3.6 km (2.2 mi)
- Coordinates: 45°06′50″N 07°27′16″E

Geography
- Location within Alps
- Location: Metropolitan City of Turin, Piedmont, Italy
- Parent range: Graian Alps

Geology
- Rock type: Peridotites

Climbing
- Easiest route: South-East ridge from Caselette

Monte Musinè or simply Musinè (in Piedmontese mont Musinè) is a mountain in the Graian Alps in the Metropolitan City of Turin, Piedmont, north Italy. Musinè is well known for the high cross on its peak, as well as for being the mountain closest to Turin. It is visible from the Piedmontese plateau and from the mountains in the provinces of Biella and Vercelli.

== Geography ==
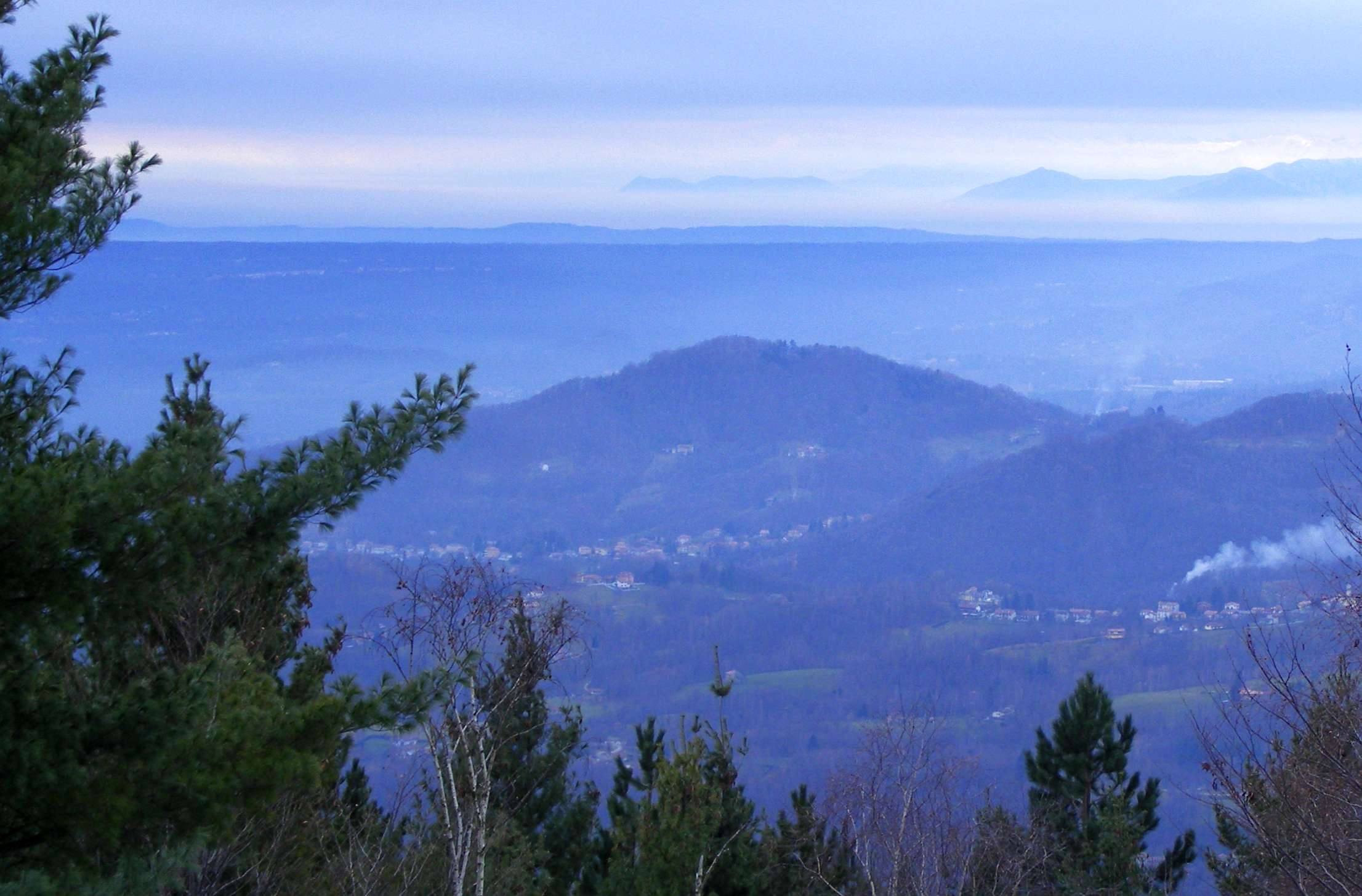
Mount Musinè (in the background) seen from Monte Casto (Pennine Alps, BI)

Mount Musinè is the easternmost mountain of the long ridge which, starting from Rocciamelone, divides the valleys of Susa and Lanzo.

Its main summit has a subsummit called Truc dell'Eremita (Hermit's hill, 1.101 m), and is surrounded by several minor hills. To the east on a 535 m high hill stands Saint Abaco's sanctuary, and to the northeast on Monte Calvo, 551 m high, there is a Via Crucis leading to a chapel.

Mount Musinè is connected to the neighbouring Mount Curto (1.323 m) by a broad wooded ridge, the lowest point of which is the Colle della Bassetta (Bassetta's pass, 945 m).

Mount Musinè's summit is a tripoint at which the borders of the municipalities of Caselette, Almese and Val della Torre meet.

=== SOIUSA classification ===
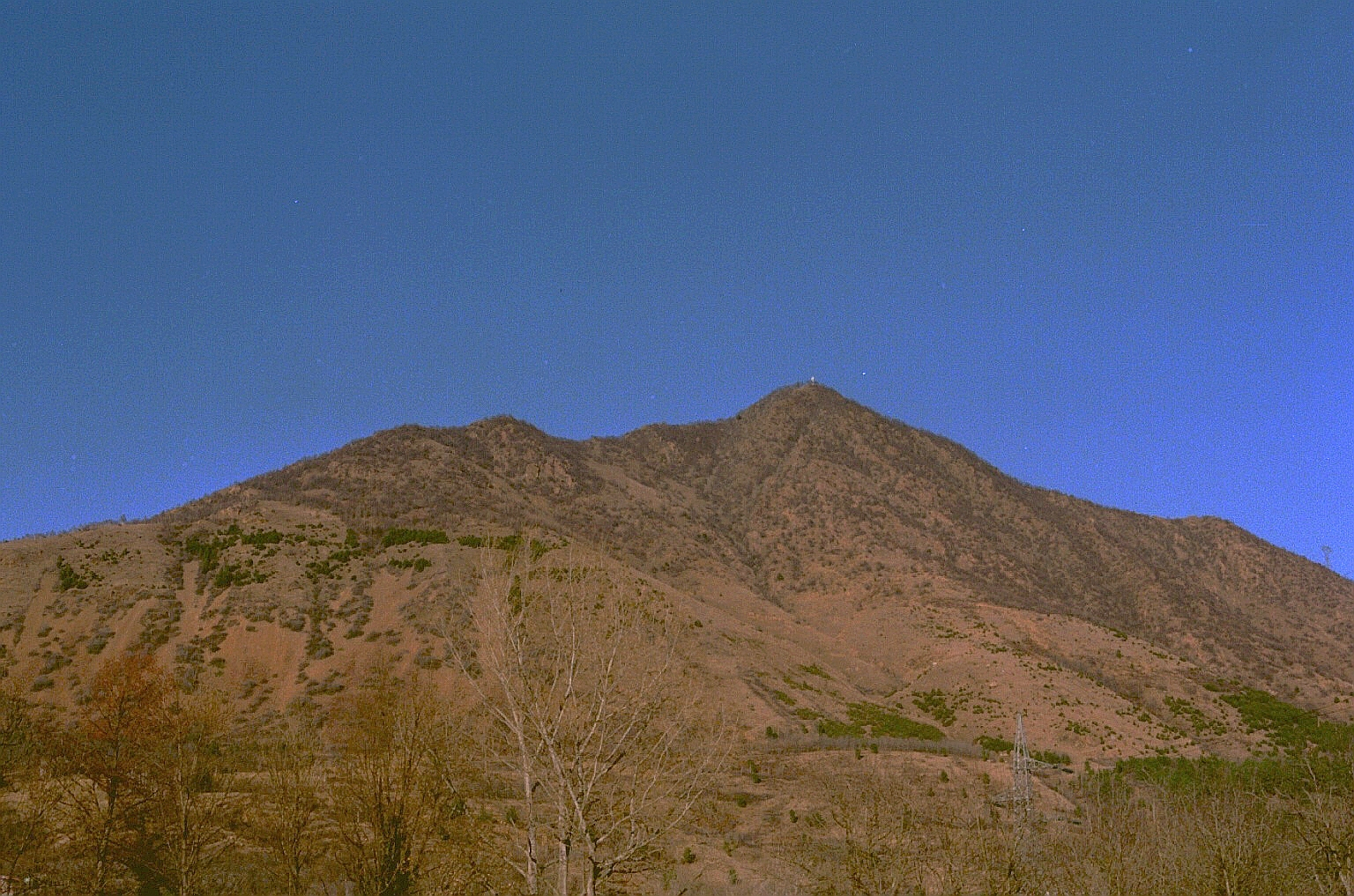
Musinè's south face

According to SOIUSA (International Standardized Mountain Subdivision of the Alps) Mount Musinè can be classified in the following way:

- main part = Western Alps
- major sector = North Western Alps
- section = Graian Alps
- subsection = Southern Graian Alps
- supergroup = catena Rocciamelone-Charbonel
- group = gruppo del Rocciamelone
- subgroup = cresta Lunella-Arpone
- code = I/B-7.I-A.2.b

== History ==
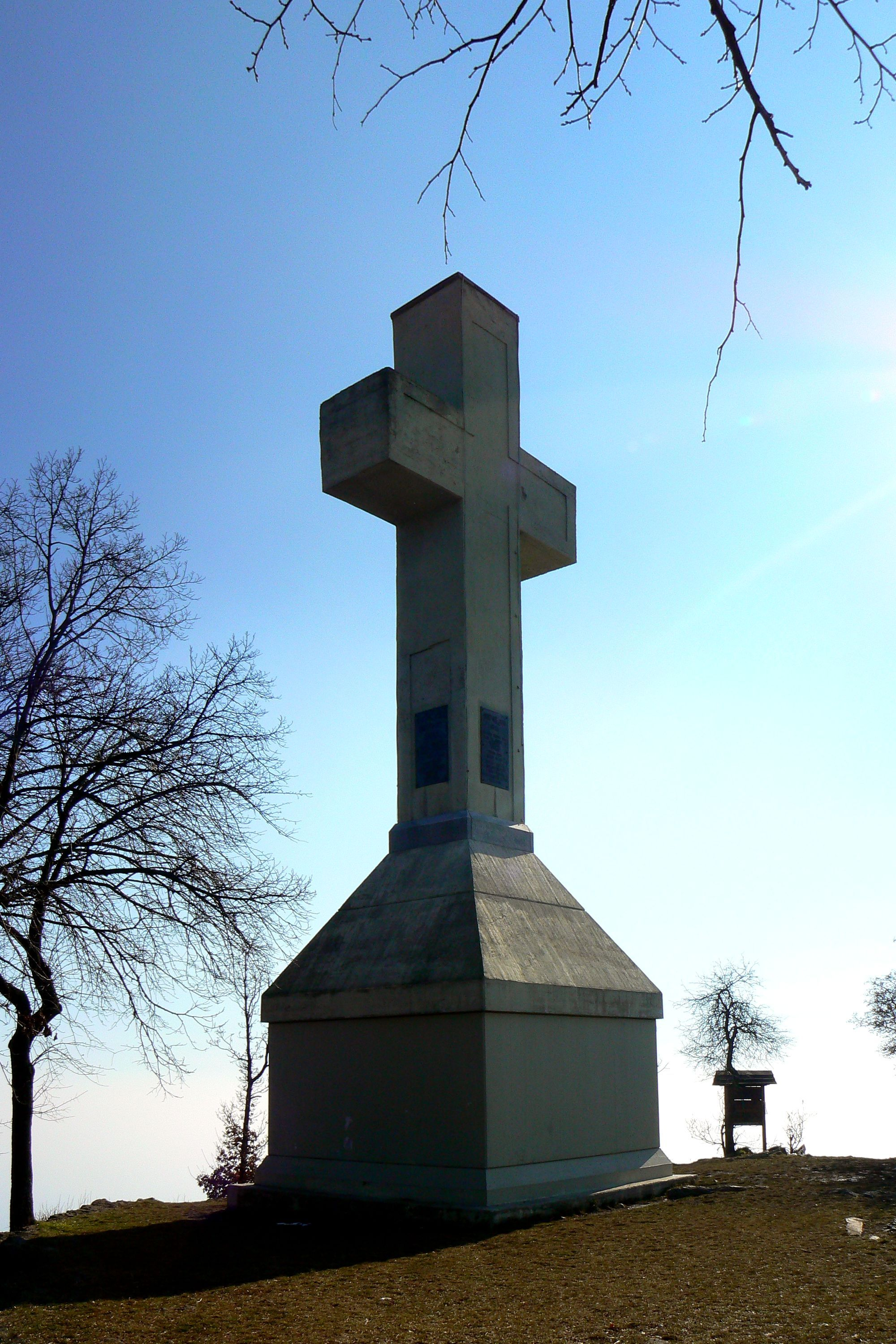
Summit cross

A number of prehistoric and protohistoric archaeological sites have been discovered in the area. These include traces of a hut dating to the early Bronze Age (ca 1700 BC) found in Caselette, and several finds from the late Iron Age in the vicinity of Almese (Truc Randolera).

Two Roman buildings from the imperial period are located near the mountain: a villa rustica in Caselette and a large residential villa in Almese (Grange di Rivera).

A local tradition states that it was near Mount Musinè (and therefore not during the Battle of the Milvian Bridge) that the emperor Constantine I saw a flaming cross and the words In hoc signo vinces shortly before the Battle of Turin (312) against his rival Maxentius, which he won.

In 1901 a 15 m high cross was built on the top of the mountain using reinforced concrete.

On the northeastern slopes of Mount Musinè several magnesite quarries were active between 1875 and the Second World War.

=== UFO sightings ===
Several encounters with UFOs have been reported around the mountain from the 1970s onward.

Quite well known is the case of December 8, 1978, when two young hikers walking on the slopes of the Musinè saw a bright light; one of them, after approaching it, temporarily disappeared. His mate, with the help of some passers-by, searched for him and after a while found his friend in a state of shock and with a noticeable scald on one leg. After regaining consciousness the young man he reported having seen an elongated vehicle and that some strangely shaped beings descended from it, touching and hefting him. Both the young hikers suffered from conjunctivitis for some time.

== Nature conservation ==
The mountain and its surrounding area are included in a SIC (Site of Community Importance) of 1,524.29 ha called Monte Musine' e Laghi di Caselette (code IT1110081).
