= Monte Colombano =

Mountain in Italy

- Mont Colombon (in Piedmontese)
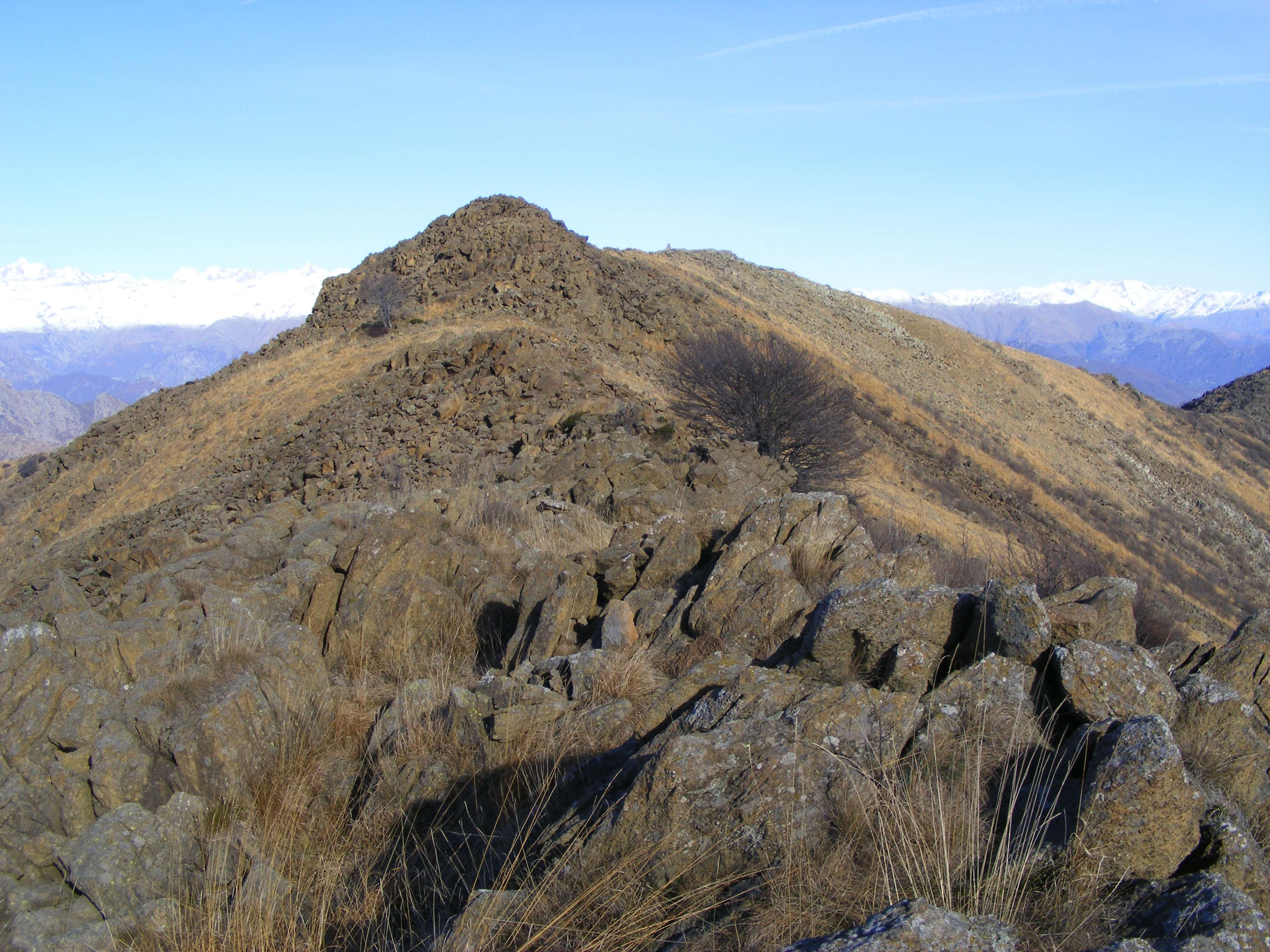
- The summit of Monte Colombano

Highest point
- Elevation: 1,658 m (5,440 ft)
- Prominence: 346 m (1,135 ft)
- Isolation: 6.21 km (3.86 mi)
- Coordinates: 45°11′59″N 7°25′53″E

Geography
- Location within Alps
- Location: Province of Turin, Italy
- Parent range: Graian Alps

Climbing
- Easiest route: Hiking from Colle Lunella

Monte Colombano (in Piedmontese mont Colombon ) is a mountain in the Alpi di Lanzo, a sub-group of the Graian Alps in Italy, with an elevation of 1,658 m.

== Geography ==
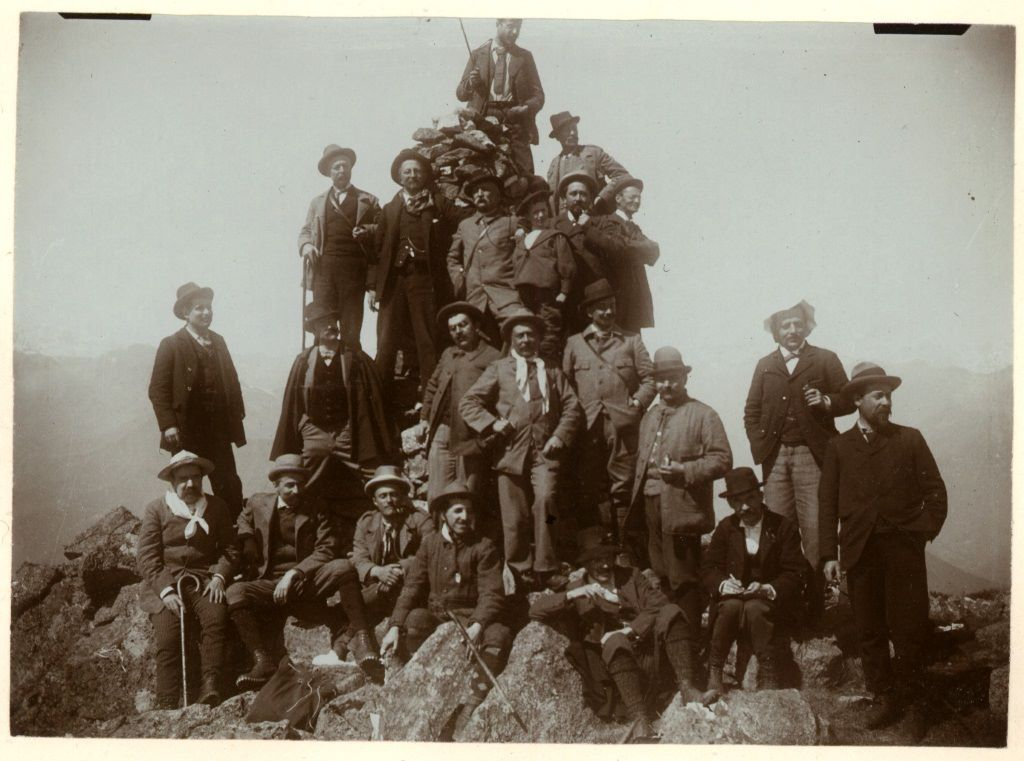
1899: hikers on the summit (photo by Mario Gabinio)

The mountain is located between the Val Casternone, the Val di Viù and the Ceronda valley and is the tripoint where the communes of Viù, Varisella and Val della Torre (all in the Metropolitan City of Turin) meet.

=== SOIUSA classification ===
According to the SOIUSA (International Standardized Mountain Subdivision of the Alps) the mountain can be classified in the following way:

- main part = Western Alps
- major sector = North Western Alps
- section = Graian Alps
- subsection = Southern Graian Alps
- supergroup = catena Rocciamelone-Charbonel
- group = gruppo del Rocciamelone
- subgroup = cresta Lunella-Arpone
- code = I/B-7.I-A.2.b

== Geology ==
Like other mountains of its area, the monte Colombano too is mainly made of lherzolitic rocks, partially turned into serpentinite.

== Access to the summit ==
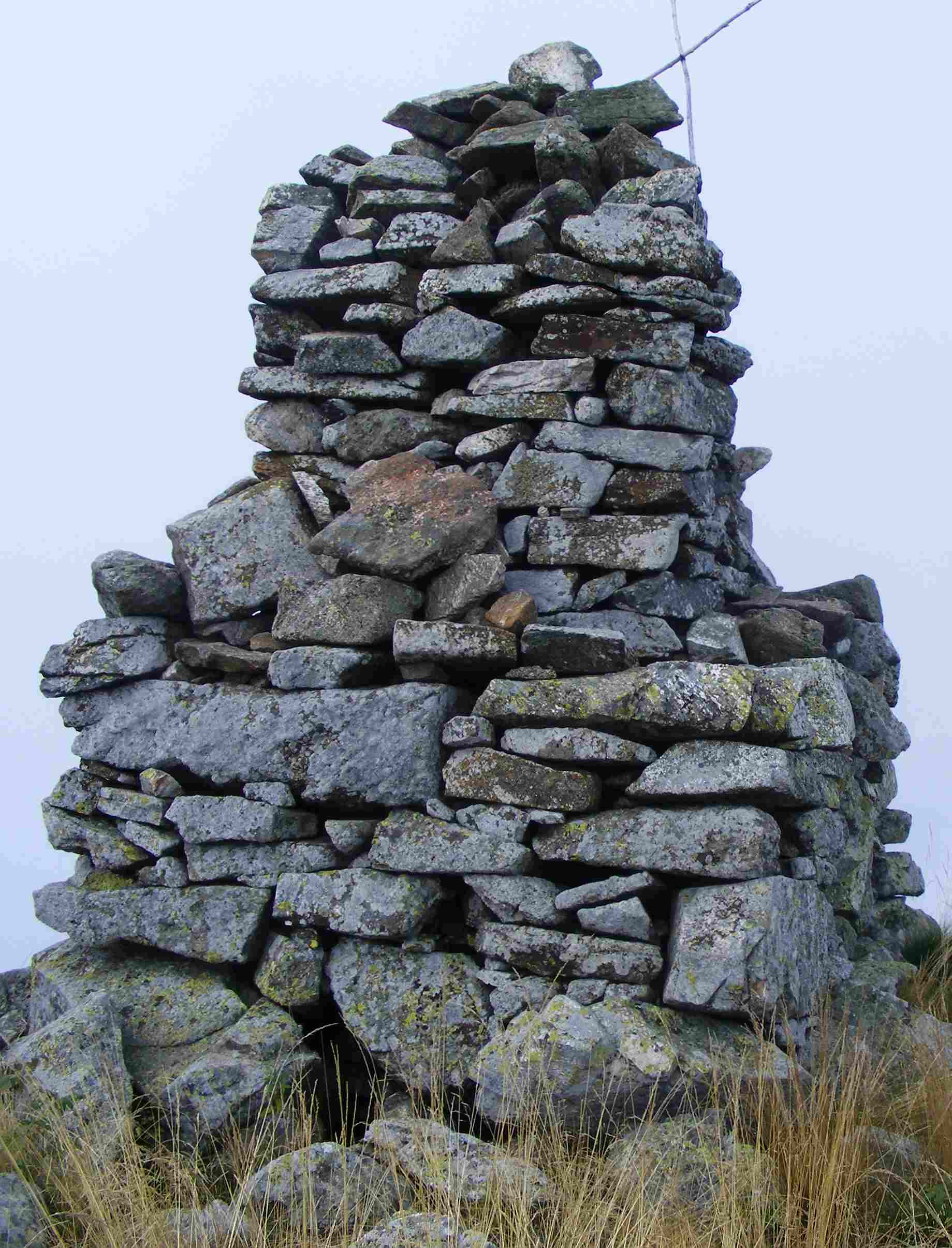
The summit's cairn

The easiest route for the summit is a footpath starting from colle Lunella (a mountain pass which connects Viù and Val della Torre), and follows the SW face of the mountain. The pass can be easily reached from the Colle del Lis. or from Val della Torre, but from the latter starting point the climb is longer. During very snowy winters, and when the snow cover is stable, the summit can also be accessed with snowshoes.

== Maps ==
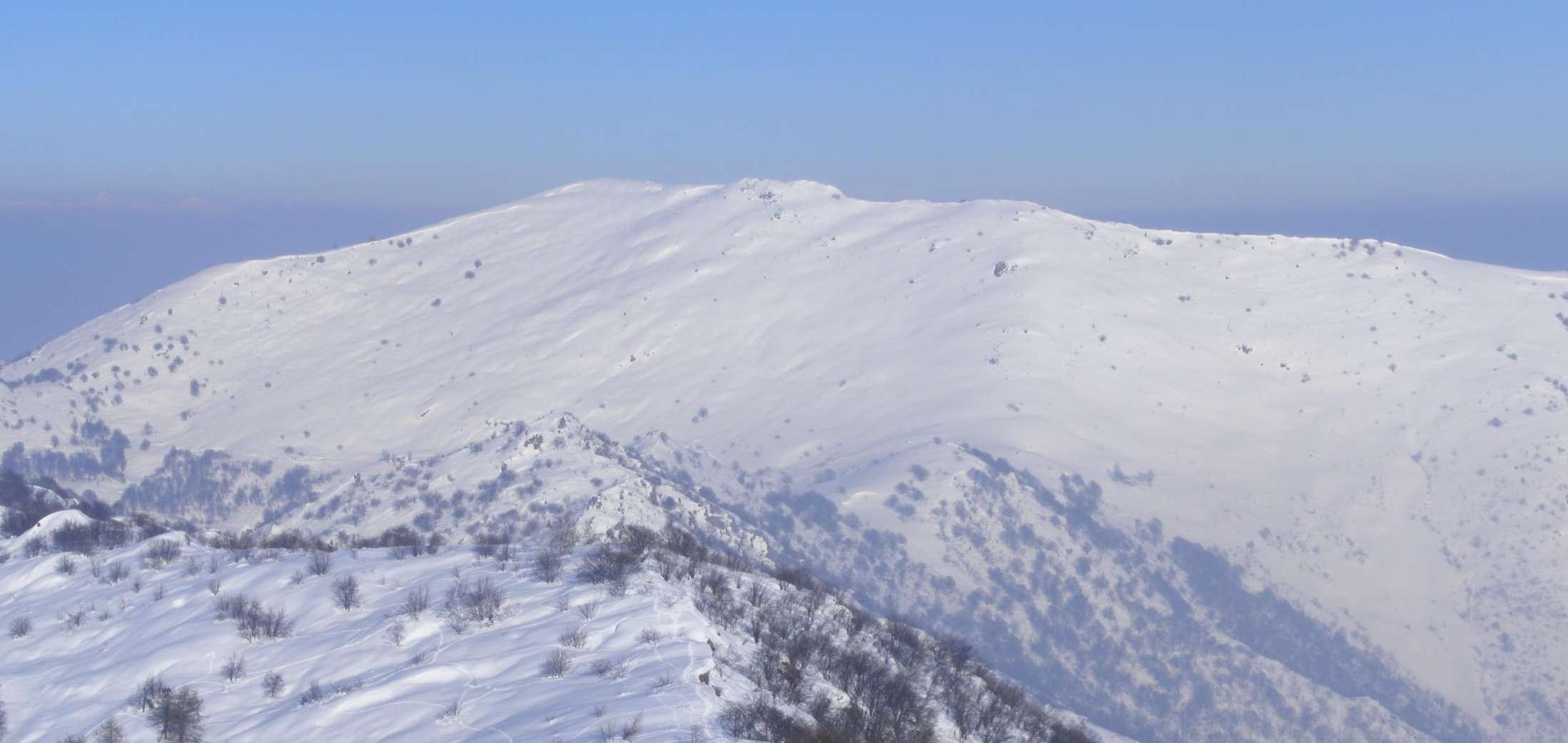
Winter view from Monte Arpone

- Italian official cartography (Istituto Geografico Militare - IGM); on-line version: www.pcn.minambiente.it
- I.G.C. (Istituto Geografico Centrale): Carta dei sentieri e dei rifugi 1:50.000 scale n.2 Valli di Lanzo e Moncenisio and 1:25.000 scale n.110 Basse valli di Lanzo
