= Caselette =

- Comune
- Comune di Caselette
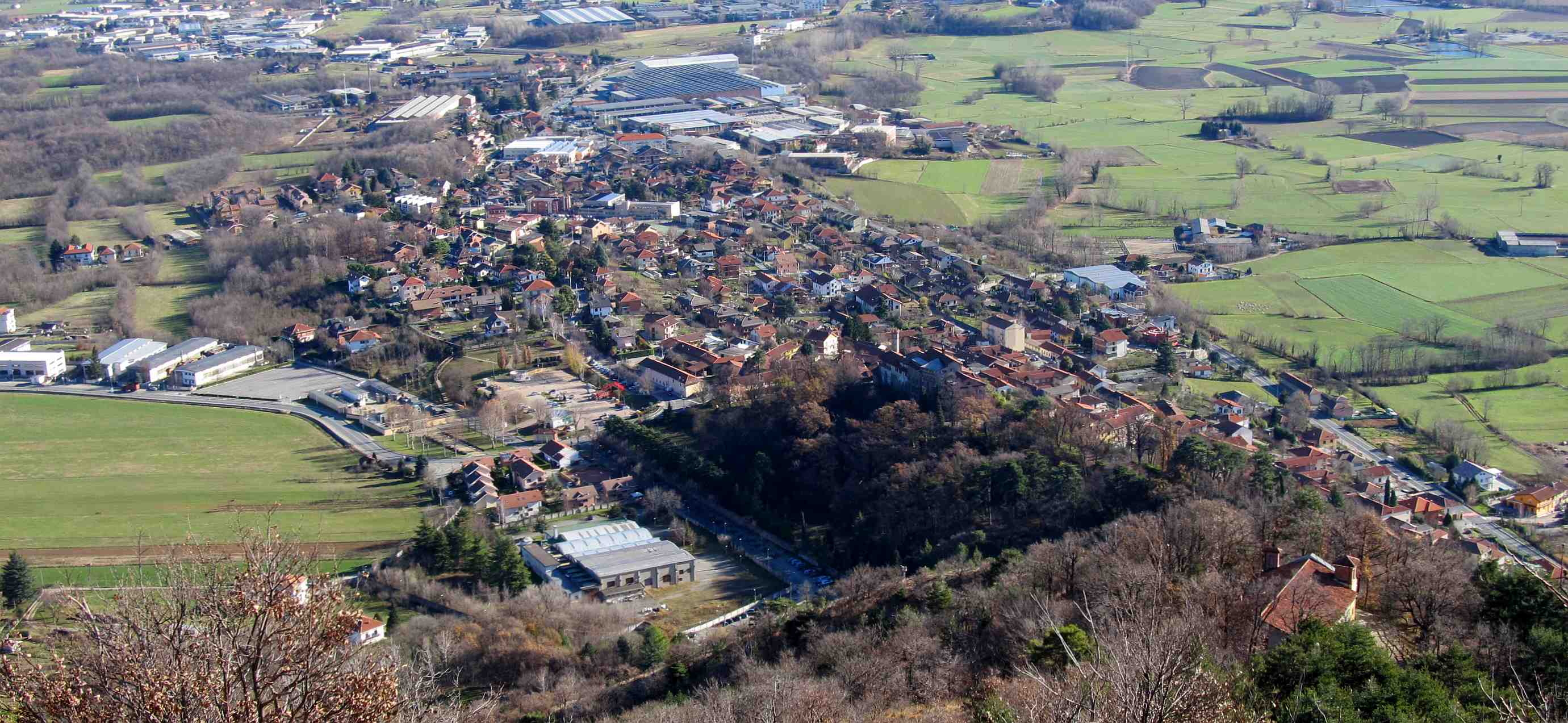
- View

- Coat of arms

- Location within Italy Location within Piedmont
- Coordinates: 45°06′N 7°28′E
- Country: Italy
- Region: Piedmont
- Metropolitan city: Turin (TO)
- Frazioni: Grange di Caselette, Grangiotto

Government
  - Mayor: Pacifico Banchieri

Area
  - Total: 14.31 km^{2} (5.53 sq mi)
- Elevation: 350 m (1,150 ft)

Population (1-1-2017)
  - Total: 3,049
  - Density: 213.1/km^{2} (551.8/sq mi)
- Demonym: Caselettese(i)
- Time zone: UTC+1 (CET)
  - Summer (DST): UTC+2 (CEST)
- Postal code: 10040
- Dialing code: 011
- Patron saint: St. George; St. Marius, Marta Audifax and Abacus
- Saint day: April 23; January 19
- Website: Official website

Caselette is a town and comune in the Metropolitan City of Turin, in the Piedmont region of northern Italy.

It is located at the entrance of the Val di Susa, 18 kilometres (11 mi) from Turin, at the foot of Monte Musinè. It is home to the Castle of the Cays Count, which is currently owned by the Salesians. Rock carvings of uncertain origin and the remains of a Roman villa have been found in the vicinity, on Mount Musinè. Close to Caselette stands the Pietra Alta, one of the biggest and more popular glacial erratics of Piedmont.

== Twin towns ==
- Ricse, Hungary, since 2004
