= Val della Torre =

- Comune
- Comune di Val della Torre
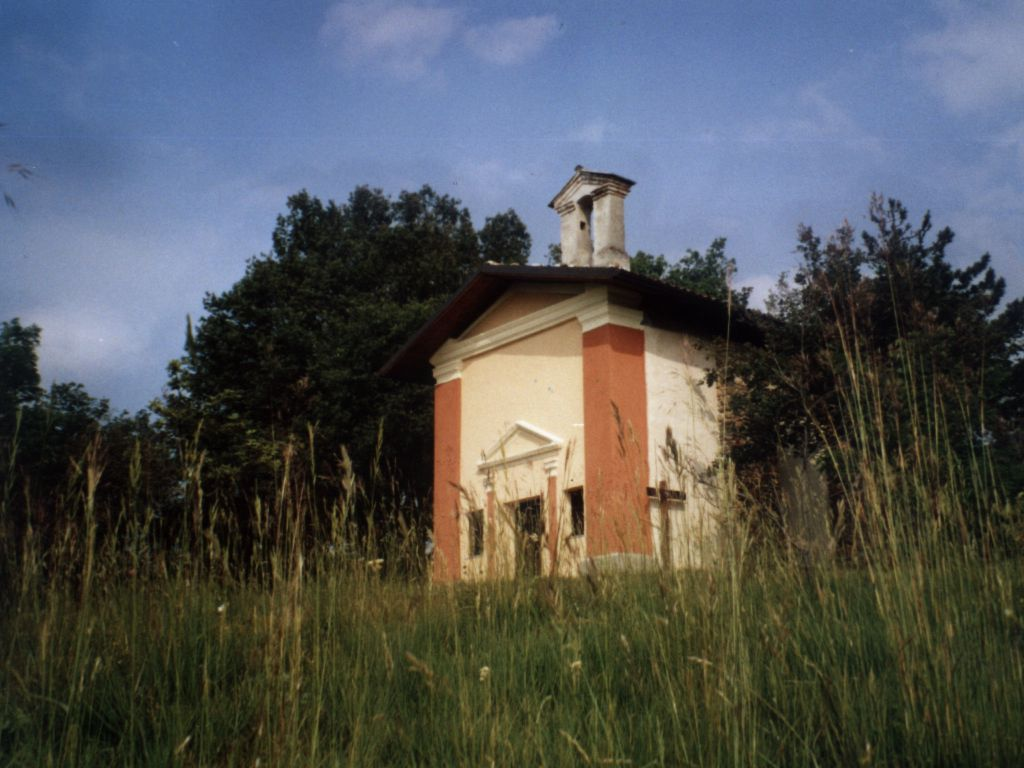
- Chapel of St. Valerian

- Coat of arms

- Location within Italy Location within Piedmont
- Coordinates: 45°10′N 7°26′E
- Country: Italy
- Region: Piedmont
- Metropolitan city: Turin (TO)

Government
  - Mayor: Carlo Tappero

Area
  - Total: 36.53 km^{2} (14.10 sq mi)
- Elevation: 505 m (1,657 ft)

Population (1-1-2017)
  - Total: 3,853
  - Density: 105.5/km^{2} (273.2/sq mi)
- Demonym: Valtorrese(i)
- Time zone: UTC+1 (CET)
  - Summer (DST): UTC+2 (CEST)
- Postal code: 10040
- Dialing code: 011

Val della Torre is a comune (municipality) in the Metropolitan City of Turin in the Italian region Piedmont, located about 25 kilometres (16 mi) northwest of Turin.

It is situated in the Graian Alps. The Monte Colombano's summit is in the municipal territory.
