= Caselle Torinese =

- Comune
- Comune di Caselle Torinese
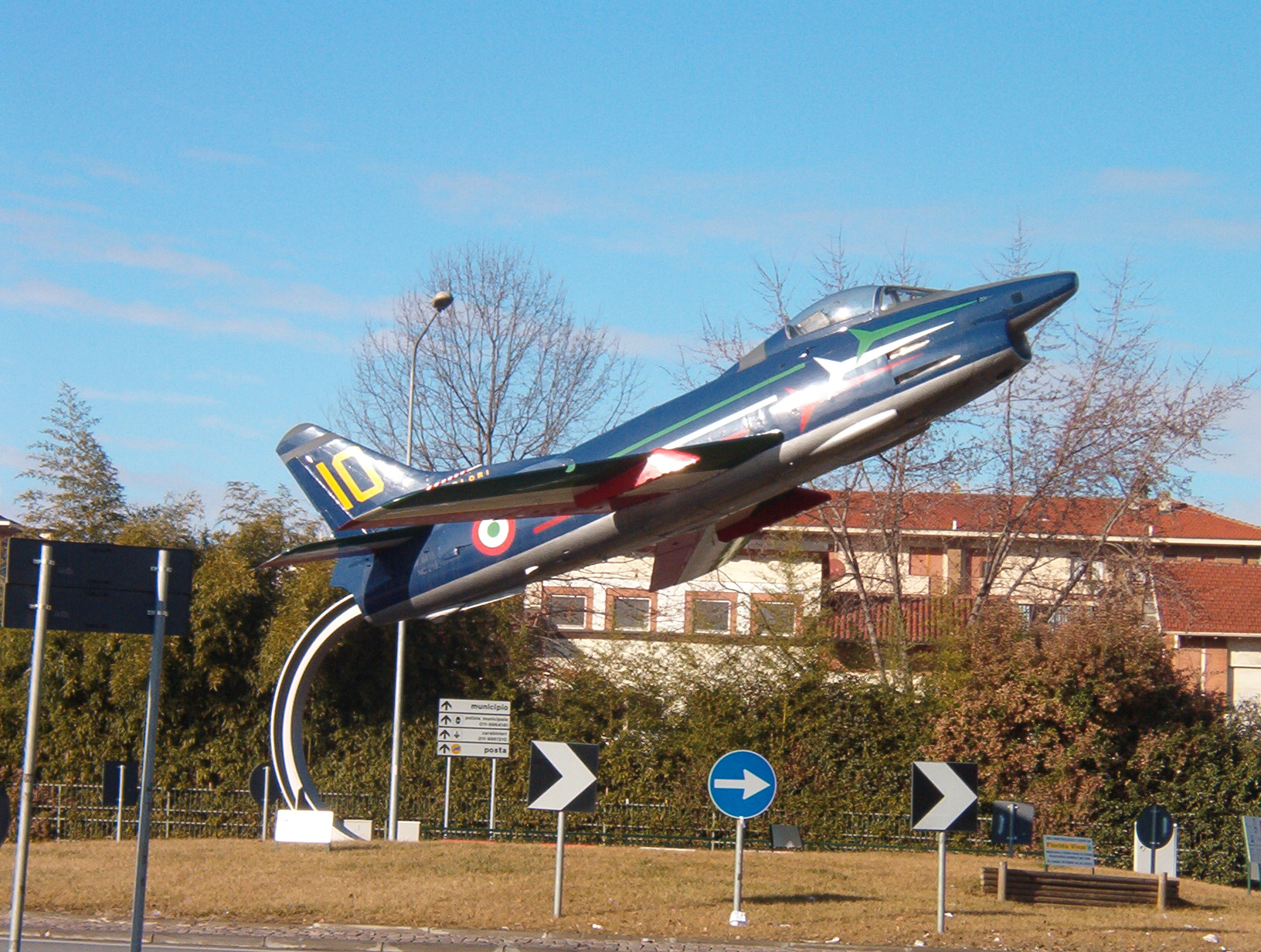
- Caselle Torinese in January 2008

- Coat of arms

- Location within Italy Location within Piedmont
- Coordinates: 45°11′N 7°39′E
- Country: Italy
- Region: Piedmont
- Metropolitan city: Turin (TO)
- Frazioni: Borgata Francia

Government
  - Mayor: Luca Baracco (PD)

Area
  - Total: 23.58 km^{2} (9.10 sq mi)
- Elevation: 300 m (980 ft)

Population (31-10-2018)
  - Total: 13,970
  - Density: 592.5/km^{2} (1,534/sq mi)
- Demonym: Casellese(i)
- Time zone: UTC+1 (CET)
  - Summer (DST): UTC+2 (CEST)
- Postal code: 10072
- Dialing code: 011
- Website: Official website

Caselle Torinese is a comune (municipality) in the Metropolitan City of Turin in the Italian region Piedmont, located about 14 kilometres (9 mi) northwest of Turin, on the left bank of the Stura di Lanzo.

== See also ==
- Turin Airport
