= Stura di Lanzo =

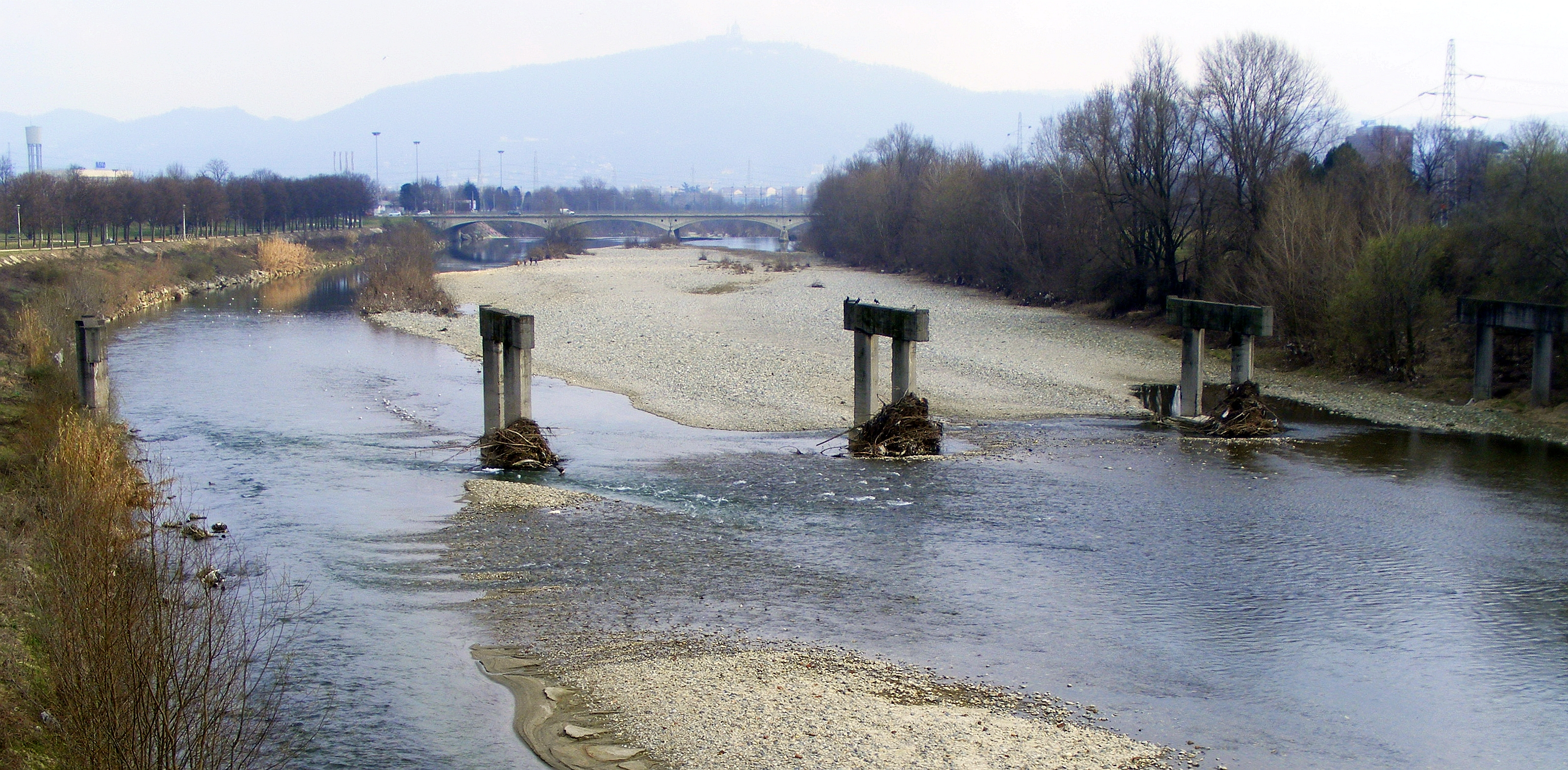
- The Stura di Lanzo in Turin

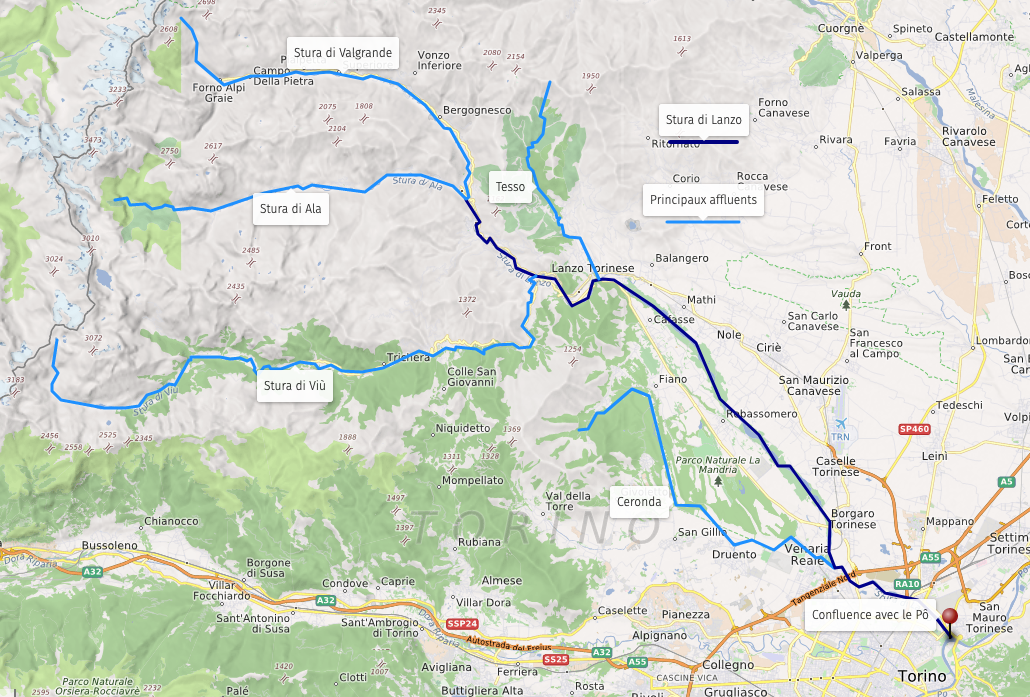
- Stura location with main tributaries

Location
- Country: Italy: province of Turin

Physical characteristics
- Source
  - location: Pian della Mussa
  - elevation: 1,850 m (6,070 ft)
- Mouth
  - location: Po in Turin
  - coordinates: 45.0956°N 7.72472°E
  - elevation: 209.0 m (685.7 ft)
- Length: 68.8 km (42.8 mi)
- Basin size: 885.9 km^{2} (342.0 mi^{2})
- Discharge
  - average: (mouth) 26.1 m^{3}/s (920 cu ft/s)

Basin features
- Progression: Po→ Adriatic Sea
- Tributaries
  - left: Stura di Valgrande, Tesso
  - right: Stura di Viù, Ceronda

Stura di Lanzo (Latin: Varus) is a 65-kilometre (40 mi) long river in north-western Italy (Piedmont), in the Metropolitan City of Turin. It is formed from several tributaries near Lanzo Torinese. It flows into the river Po in Turin.

== Toponymy ==
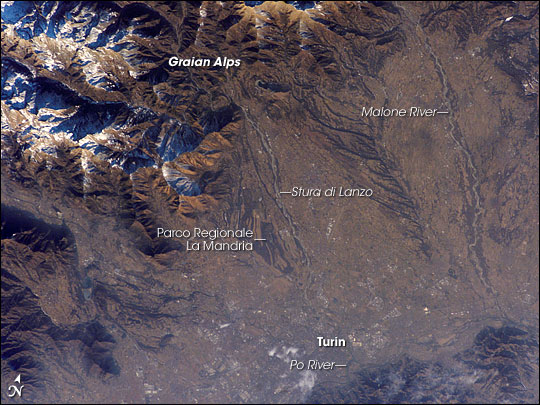
Satellite picture showing the river descending from the Graian Alps

The name Stura has a Celtic origin: stur, which means "to fall".

== Main tributaries ==
- Rio Bonello,
- Rio Uppia,
- Rio dell'Uia,
- Stura di Viù,
- Tesso,
- Ceronda.
