= Givoletto =

- Comune
- Comune di Givoletto
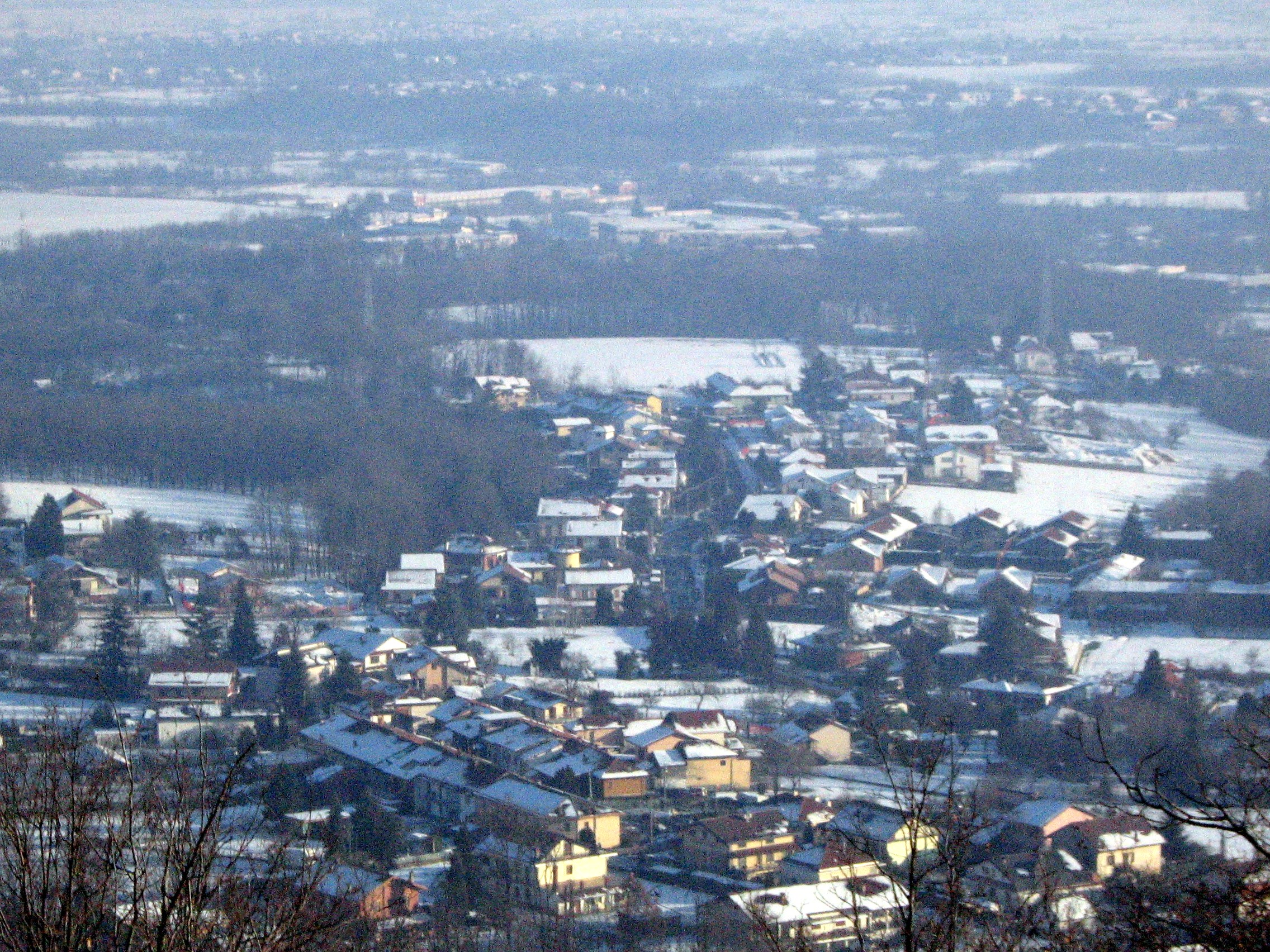
- The frazione of Forvilla.

- Coat of arms

- Location within Italy Location within Piedmont
- Coordinates: 45°10′N 7°30′E
- Country: Italy
- Region: Piedmont
- Metropolitan city: Turin (TO)
- Frazioni: Borgonuovo, Bogialla, Rivasacco, Forvilla, Santa Maria, Centro (Canton Mosca), Regione Imai

Government
  - Mayor: Azzurra Mulatero

Area
  - Total: 12.8 km^{2} (4.9 sq mi)
- Elevation: 400 m (1,300 ft)

Population (31 December 2010)
  - Total: 3,862
  - Density: 302/km^{2} (781/sq mi)
- Demonym: Givolettesi
- Time zone: UTC+1 (CET)
  - Summer (DST): UTC+2 (CEST)
- Postal code: 10040
- Dialing code: 011

Givoletto is a comune (municipality) in the Metropolitan City of Turin in the Italian region Piedmont, located about 20 kilometres (12 mi) northwest of Turin.

It is located at the feet of the Graian Alps's first reliefs from Turin's plain, with elevations such as the Monte Lera at 1,368 metres (4,488 ft) above sea level. Givoletto is home to the Madonna della Neve Natural Preserve, established to preserve the Euphorbia gibelliana, a plant which grows only in this area.

In the winter the city usually have some snowy days, and also many days with negative temperatures.
