= Varisella =

- Comune
- Comune di Varisella
- Coat of arms

- Location within Italy Location within Piedmont
- Coordinates: 45°13′N 7°29′E
- Country: Italy
- Region: Piedmont
- Metropolitan city: Turin (TO)
- Frazioni: Baratonia, Mocolombone, Ramai

Government
  - Mayor: Mariarosa Colombatto

Area
  - Total: 22.5 km^{2} (8.7 sq mi)
- Elevation: 514 m (1,686 ft)

Population (Dec. 2004)
  - Total: 764
  - Density: 34.0/km^{2} (87.9/sq mi)
- Demonym: Varisellesi
- Time zone: UTC+1 (CET)
  - Summer (DST): UTC+2 (CEST)
- Postal code: 10070
- Dialing code: 011

Varisella is a comune (municipality) in the Metropolitan City of Turin in the Italian region Piedmont, located in the Val Ceronda about 25 kilometres (16 mi) northwest of Turin.

The highest point of its territory is Monte Colombano's summit, 1,658 metres (5,440 ft) above sea level.
