= Druento =

- Comune
- Comune di Druento
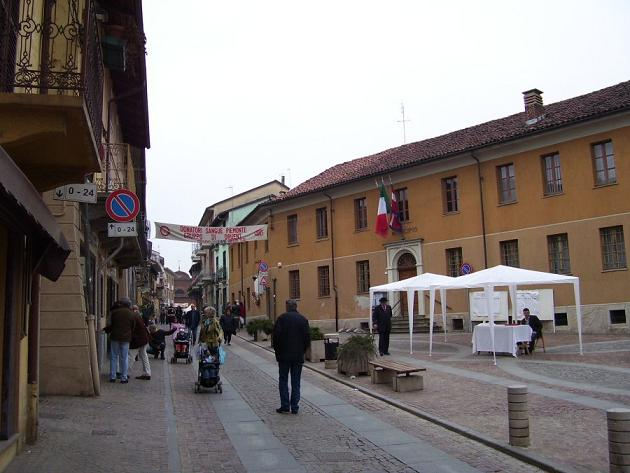

- Coat of arms

- Location within Italy Location within Piedmont
- Coordinates: 45°8′N 7°35′E
- Country: Italy
- Region: Piedmont
- Metropolitan city: Turin (TO)
- Frazioni: Peppinella

Government
  - Mayor: Carlo Vietti (Insieme Per Druento)

Area
  - Total: 27.54 km^{2} (10.63 sq mi)
- Elevation: 285 m (935 ft)

Population (31 December 2018)
  - Total: 8,863
  - Density: 321.8/km^{2} (833.5/sq mi)
- Demonym: Druentini
- Time zone: UTC+1 (CET)
  - Summer (DST): UTC+2 (CEST)
- Postal code: 10040
- Dialing code: 011
- Website: Official website

Druento is a comune (municipality) in the Metropolitan City of Turin in the Italian region Piedmont, located about 12 kilometres (7 mi) northwest of Turin.

Druento is located in a hilly-plain territory, between the Givoletto mountains and the Turin plain. Attractions include La Mandria Regional Park, housing a former house of Savoy Royal residence.

Druento is an industrial town. Here, during the 20th century, numerous immigrants from southern Italy moved to work at FIAT or connected companies.
