= Gen Movement =

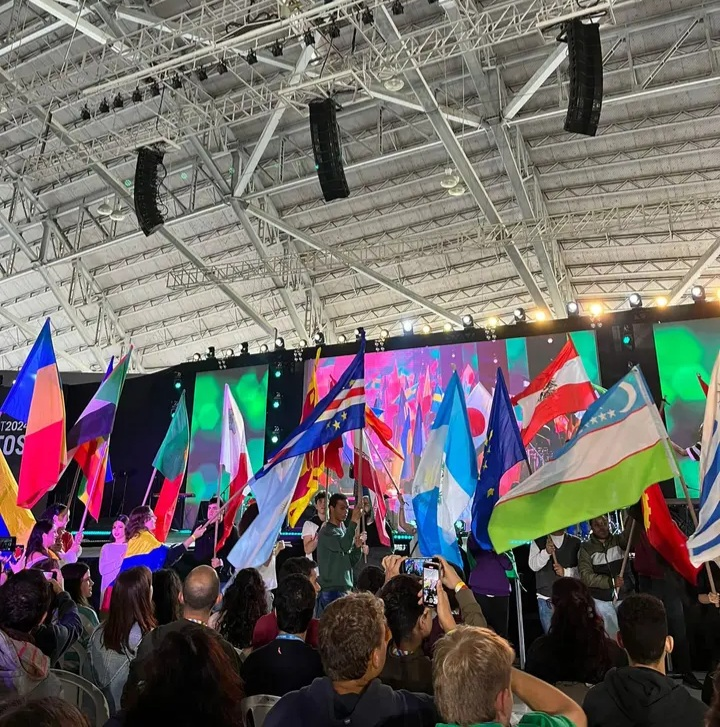
Youth at the world meeting of the Gen Movement, known as Genfest

The Gen Movement (New Generation) is one of the youth branches of the Focolare Movement. Born in the midst of the global youth unrest of the 1960s, today is active and present in more than 100 countries Based upon the ideals of unity and universal brother/sisterhood grounded in the Golden Rule, it was founded by Chiara Lubich on July 6, 1966 during their first Congress in Rome. Started as a Roman Catholic lay movement, it remains largely Roman Catholic in membership but has strong links and member of many major Christian denominations, other religions and non-religious people.

== History ==
Following the first 20 years of the Focolare Movement, in 1963, many of the first adherents have become adults (Chiara herself was 43) and many have had children in the meantime. A two-fold gap both in the number of adherents between age 15 to 30 compared to the rest and the great differences between the pre-war generation and the post-war generation made many youngster to search for how to live the Ideal as Youth. Between 1963 and 1967 many of "intermediate age" started to build actions and events together, reaching to Chiara who closely followed their work to keep the unity of the Movement, and in the awakening that will lead to the 1968 Protests, the irrequietude was set to create something new, not a new branch parallel as those that the movement was thinking in the Post-Vatican II years, but a horizontal one defined by age.

The term the youth choose to call to identify themselves was "Gen", an abbreviation of "new GENeration", being the second generation of the Focolare Movement. Simple and well defined it was chosen to encapsulate what they brought: something new, "revolutionary" as the whole youth was claiming in that moment. Chiara Lubich founded the Gen Movement to live the Ideal as youngsters; she opened the first edition of the homonymous magazine writing:

«Dear friends, let me introduce myself, I am GEN, a tiny magazine that is coming out for the first time. I tell you the truth, if I didn't know how much you understanding, I would feel trembling with shyness. In fact, I am taking my first steps, or rather, my first step. My name means "New Generation". I was put together by an editorial staff composed of some boys and girls who already know what I want to express through my words, my drawings, my photos. If I am tiny in size and perhaps inadequate even to call myself a magazine, I have the impression that I have a big task. Let me explain. In these times – as you know – the duty to work for peace is insisted upon everywhere. Why? Because men, on various occasions, are unable to reach an agreement. They have so many problems and do not want to give in and so a terrible war could break out at any moment. Well, I think that we do not generally have all these difficulties. For us, working and studying with French, German, African, Italians, Chinese, Australian, Indian and so on youngsters enriches our personality with many positive contributions that people of different civilizations, cultures and races can bring. So, if we happen to be rich, we don't find it strange to play with the poor and vice versa. Of course, all this if we have not been contaminated by the mentality of an old society that still wants the world disunited, while all men are brothers, because they are children of God, and the sister nations and humanity are one big family. Here then is the task of GEN, your newspaper: to gather the greatest number of youngsters in the world and launch a great revolution shouting "let's unite". After all, tomorrow's world will be on our shoulders and we are responsible for it already now. Let's work to create it as we like. In this way we will be able to give our contribution also to today's society. After all, I, GEN, know that I do not speak to a few. In more than a hundred nations I will have collaborators who will give me a hand and will translate my articles into other languages. I have faith in my mission and I am sure that you will share it.»

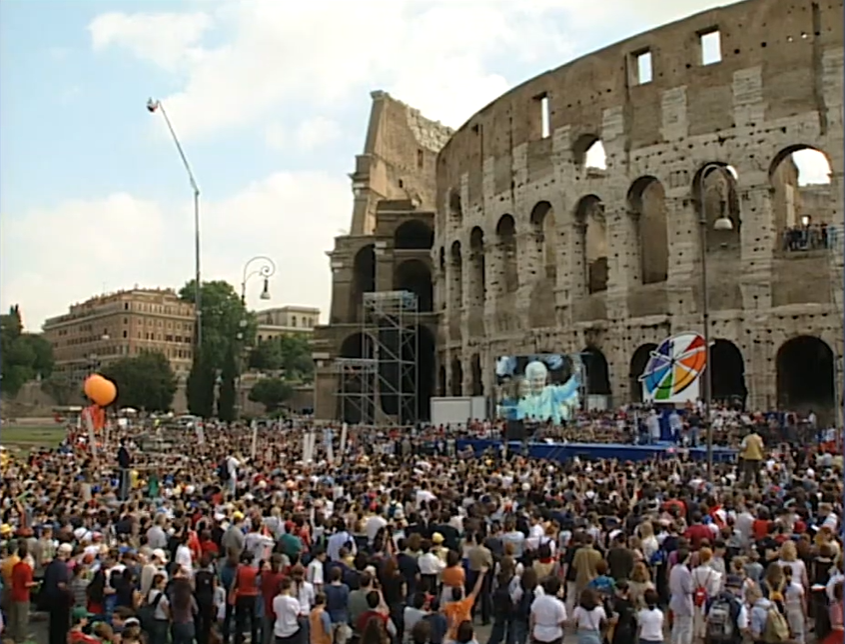
Chiara Lubich at the 2002 International Congress in front of the Colosseum

The Gen Movement grew very fast in the midst of protests and clashes, especially thanks to its message of a revolution different from the authoritarian, anarchist or communist ones. The foundress of the Focolare Movement worked closely with the newborn movement during the protests, in order to unite the youngster that orbitated around the Ideal in their call for a revolution as their peers, but at the same time pass the "baton" that the 23-years-old Lubich had chosen as life call: "That all may be One". From the adherence of thousands of youngster worldwide this program became fully alive, the new generation of the Focolari Movement, the Gen Movement.

While it was born from and for people aged 15 to 30 years old, in the 1970s a new branch of kids that were 12-14 asked for their movement too, reason why today there are 3 branches in the Gen Movement:

- Gen2, as the name says "the second generation" (in comparison to the adults, who are the first), made of youth aged 18–30.

- Gen3, as the name says "the third generation", made of teens aged 9–17

- Gen4, as the name says "the fourth generation", made of kids aged 4–8

This subdivision is most visible in areas where there are many gen (such as Italy and Brasil), where one can find also two branching of the Gen3 (Middle School Teens and High School Teens) and also for Gen2 (such as University Early-Adults and Young Adults) to build unities more akin in age.

Each group can build their own journal with the adults of the Focolare Movement, such as Teens for teens or the long-standing Gen Journal for young adults.

== Thought ==
Based on the same ideal of the Focolare Movement, Chiara Lubich proposed for the Gen Movement a singular (in form, not in substance) vision of God's Love, realizable as a way of live trought the so-called "Rainbow Revolution":

[…] just as light splits into seven colours, those of the rainbow, but red, orange, yellow, green, blue, indigo, violet are always light, so love is always love […]

Chiara gave the Gen Movement a simple representation to simbolise the application of Love to different aspects of daily lives. All colours were proposed to be lived in the personal sphere, but with the communitarian perspective that characterise Chiara's Ideal at group level, often it's used to try to live one colour for some time and be responsible for it (especially with groups, called "gen unities"). Hereafter their description:

- Red: the communion of goods and experiences, economy and work (Love encourage sharing);
- Orange: dissemination of the spirituality of Unity (Love radiates to those around us);
- Yellow: relationship with God, or with the trascendent, and spiritual life (Love uplifts and inspire us);
- Green: physical health, nature and ecology (Love nurtures);
- Blue: art, order and harmony (Love creates harmony);
- Indigo: study and search for wisdom (Love generates wisdom);
- Violet: communication and mass media(Love bring us together).

By side of these 7 colours, an 8th has been added, black, that is about the difficulties in the socio-political landscape (Love guides society). In the gen unities it is normal also to find a white, that is the gen who works for the cohesion of the group as pivot.

For youngsters the possibility of living these colours on worldwide communities has been opened after the 2018 Genfest in the Philippines, where many youngsters united to bring forth projects known as"Pathways for a United World". In the last months of 2024 new teams made on theme and not projects are set to start, 8 "CommUnity" (es. Economy&Work, Education&Research, Dialogue&Interculture, ...).

For the most young, especially for kids, Chiara used a more simple way than the colours to make the ideal becoming a way of life applicable by anyone. The solution was the "Dice of Love", that is to be thrown each day to live the result face. The faces say:

- Love everyone

- Love by being closer to the other

- Love the other as yourself

- Be the first to Love

- Love mutually

- Love your enemy

== Member proposed for Sainthood ==
Despite the brevity of the Gen Movement, some of the Catholic members have been proposed to the Dicastery for the Causes of Saints, famously Chiara "Luce" Badano, beatified in 2010, and Santa Scorese, whose murder helped pave the way for the "crime of stalking" in Italy's Crimes Code.

=== Blessed ===
- Chiara Badano [Luce] – (1971–1990), of Sassello (Italy); declared October 25, 2010.

=== Venerables ===
- Maria Orsola Bussone – (1954–1970) of Vallo Torinese (Italy).
- Daniela Zanetta – (1962–1986), of Novara (Italy).

=== Servants of God ===
- Alberto Michelotti (1958–1980) and Carlo Grisolia [Vir] (1960–1980) of Genova (Italy). Beatification process opened at the same time, first case for two friends.
- Maria Cecilia Perrin de Buide (1957–1985), of Bahia Blanca (Argentina);
- Santa Scorese – (1968–1991) of Bari, virgin and martyr.
