= EOC =

EOC may refer to:

- Earth Observation Center
- Eastern Oregon College, now Eastern Oregon University, in La Grande, Oregon
- Eastern Orthodox Church
- Estonian Orthodox Church (disambiguation)
- Economy of Communion
- Elswick Ordnance Company, a defunct British armaments manufacturer
- Emergency operations center
- End of Course Test
- Equal Opportunities Commission (disambiguation)
- Ethernet over coax
- Ethernet over copper
- Ethics of care
- Ethnography of communication
- European Olympic Committees
- European Orienteering Championships
- Evangelical Orthodox Church
