= Genfest =

Focolare Movement international event

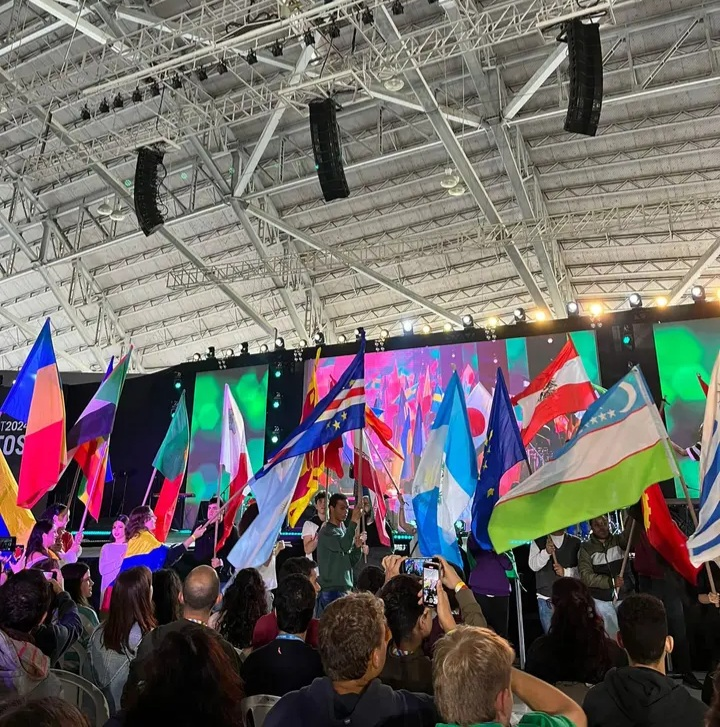
- Youth at Genfest 2024
- Status: Active
- Genre: Youth and cultural festival
- Location: International (various host cities)
- Years active: 1973–present
- Founder: Chiara Lubich
- Website: Official website

The Genfest is the gathering of young members or supporters of the Gen Movement and Youth for a United World from all over the world. Numerous activities take place, including entertainment (through artistic, theatrical, and musical performances), multicultural events (linked to the event's location and the participating nations.), and discussions on the chosen theme. The word 'Genfest' comes from the fusion of 'Gen', short for 'New Generation' (the youth of the Focolare Movement), and 'Festival'. The event has no particular regularity nor place, it is usually called with some years in advance by the World Gen Center in Rome.

== History ==
The event began in the 1970s when Chiara Lubich, president and founder of the Focolare Movement, thought of bringing together all the young members of the newly founded Gen Movement in a 'festival'. The first Genfest was held in 1973 in Loppiano, Tuscany, with about 8,000 participants, and its theme was: "Mankind beyond every barrier.". Notably, this edition included a performance by the original lineup of the musical group Gen Rosso.

Given the success of the initiative, the Genfest was held again in 1975, with about 20,000 young people in attendance and Pope Paul VI, who concluded the event by saying, 'A new world is being born'. Activities were held in Rome's Palazzo dello Sport with the theme "Unity is possible".

In 1980, after one of the pivotal years of the Cold War, the event returned to Rome, this time at the Stadio Flaminio, gathering 40,000 participants. The edition's theme was "For a United World".

The 1985 edition, held for the second time at the Palazzo dello Sport in Rome, was titled "Many Ways for a United World". This edition also marked the birth of the Youth for a United World Movement.

The 1990 edition focused on the fall of the Berlin Wall, seen as a step toward global unity. The title of the seventh edition was: "United World – An Ideal Becoming History". Notably, this year also included a visit from Pope John Paul II.

In 1995, for the first time, the event was broadcast worldwide through satellite and internet connections. As in previous editions, the theme reflected the event: "Let's Show the United World".

In 2000, the seventh edition of the Genfest took place at Rome's Stadio Flaminio, coinciding with World Youth Day

For 12 years the event wasn't repeated, until 2012 when by large demand it was held for the first time outside Italy, at the SportArena in Budapest, Hungary. 12.000 people participated at the first GenFest after the death of Chiara Lubich, under the theme of "Let's Bridge", referred to the many bridges in Hungary's capital, used as a metaphor for bridges to be built between various cultures and nations.

6 years later in 2018, the ninth edition took place in the Philippines, at the World Trade Center in Manila, with the theme "Beyond all borders". Thousands of young people gathered for five days of celebrations and discussions with experts and professors from around the world. This edition was particularly significant as it was the first Genfest held outside Europe and occurred during a time when Daesh (ISIS) had occupied some Philippine islands. Many people, especially those who couldn't afford to reach the Philippines, started to build the first local Genfests, that will spread more thoroughly in the successive edition.

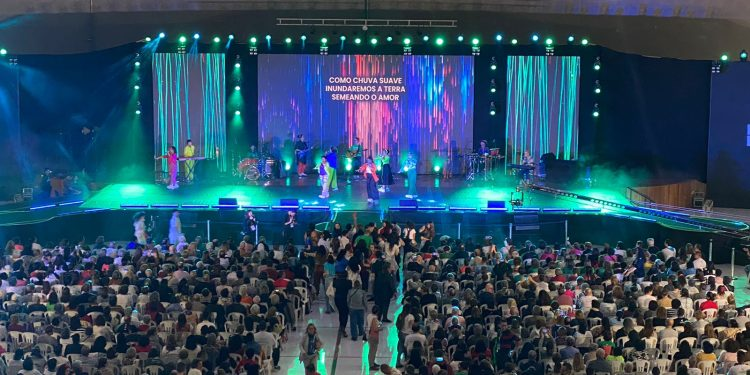
Opening of the last day of the Phase Two of GenFest 2024 with the Gen Verde Musical Group

From July 12 to 24, 2024, the tenth edition of the Genfest was held in Aparecida, Brazil, in a longer format than previous versions. It was the first edition in the Americas, and the theme was "Juntos para Cuidar", meaning "Together to Care". The event was composed of three parts:

- Phase One: thousands of young people spread across Latin America to live out Chiara's ideal where there was poverty and social difficulties, especially with Brazilian communities in the Amazon, Rio, and areas affected by the November 3, 2023, storm in São Paulo.

– Phase Two: 5,000 young participants from 90 nations gathered at the Aparecida events center for three days of celebrations (streamed to 120 countries).

– Phase Three: three days dedicated to discussions on social, cultural, artistic, political and economic themes with experts, professors, and professionals from around the world.

In parallel with the main event in Brazil, 37 local or national Genfests were held during the summer around the world.
