= Maria Voce =

Italian lawyer (1937–2025)

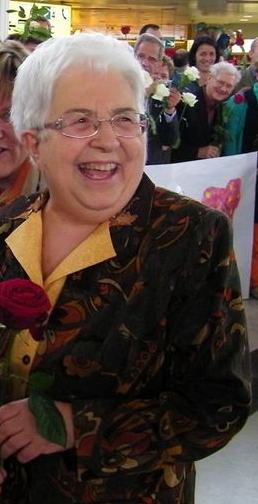
- Born: 16 July 1937; Aiello Calabro, Calabria, Italy
- Died: 20 June 2025 (aged 87); Rocca di Papa, Lazio, Italy

Maria Voce (16 July 1937 – 20 June 2025) was an Italian lawyer and president of the Focolare Movement. She was elected as the president by the General Assembly of the Movement after the death of its founder Chiara Lubich, in March 2008.

== Early life ==
Voce was born in Aiello Calabro, Calabria, Italy on 16 July 1937. Her mother was a housewife, and her father was a doctor; Voce was the eldest of their seven children.

== Legal career ==
Voce studied law in Rome, and became the first woman lawyer to practice in Cosenza. After graduating from law, she also completed studies of theology and canon law. Voce became interested in spirituality in her final year of law school. She joined the Focolare Movement in 1963. She lived in Focolare communities in Syracuse and Catania in Sicily from 1964 to 1972. Then, from 1972 to 1978, she served as part of Chiara Lubich’s personal secretariat. In 1977, she moved to Turkey. From 1978 to 1988, she had close ties with the Patriarchate of Constantinople (and later with Patriarch Bartholomew I), with leaders of other Christian Churches, and with the Muslim world. In 1988, Lubich asked Voce to return to Italy, where she began work "at the International Centre in Rocca di Papa and for the Abbà school, the Interdisciplinary Study Centre of the Focolare Movement". In 1995, she became a member of the Abbà school as a law expert.

From 2000, she was among the leaders of "Communion and Law", the movement's network of professionals and scholars engaged in justice. Between 2002 and 2007, Voce worked with Lubich to update the General Acts of the Movement. She was elected as president by the General Assembly of the Movement after the death of the founder Chiara Lubich, on 14 March 2008. She was re-elected on 12 September 2014 for a six-year term.

On 7 December 2009, Pope Benedict XVI appointed Voce as Consultor to the Pontifical Council for the Laity. In 2014, Voce received an honorary degree in laws from the University of Notre Dame for her ecumenical work as well as work with the laity. Voce also served on the steering committee of Together for Europe.

Voce died at her home in Rocca di Papa, on 20 June 2025, at the age of 87.
