= Zanetta =

Zanetta may refer to:

- Daniela Zanetta (1962 – 1986), Italian member of the Focolare Movement in the Roman Catholic Church
- Zanetta Farussi (1707 – 1776), Italian comedic actress, mother of famous adventurer Giacomo Casanova
