= Pasquale Foresi =

Presbyter and Italian theologian (1929-2015)

Pasquale Foresi (5 July 1929, Livorno – 14 June 2015, Rocca di Papa) was an Italian priest and theologian. He was connected to the Focolare Movement co-founded by him, Chiara Lubich and Igino Giordani. The Focolare Movement is an international organization that promotes the ideals of unity and universal brotherhood with other religious movements.

== Biography ==
Foresi was born on July 5, 1929, in Livorno (Italy) and attended the seminary in Pistoia and the Almo Collegio Capranica. He interrupted his studies for a while because of doubts and a crisis of faith. In December 1949 he met Chiara Lubich in Trento, Italy and immediately became interested in the Focolare Movement. “...[A]n absolute faith in the Catholic Church and at the same time a radical evangelical life, that I understood what my true place was and quickly the idea of priesthood reappeared”. He finished his studies and was ordained as a catholic priest on April 4, 1954. Father Foresi played an important role in shaping the spiritual, theological and cultural expression of the Focolare Movement. He became, with Lubich, the group's first co-president.

Foresi was in charge of relations with the Holy See, and assisted Lubich in drafting the statutes of the movement. He was instrumental in setting up the “Mariapolis Centres” that provide courses for the members, and also wrote a number of articles on the spiritual and social dimension of the theology of the Focolare Movement.

In his late years, Father Foresi lived at the Focolare headquarters in Rocca di Papa; he died on June 14, 2014.

== See also ==
- Chiara Lubich
- Igino Giordani
- Focolare Movement
