= Maria Orsola Bussone =

Italian Roman Catholic venerable

Venerable Maria Orsola Bussone
- Born: 2 October 1954; Vallo Torinese, Turin, Italy
- Died: 10 July 1970 (aged 15); Ca' Savio di Venezia, Venice, Italy
- Resting place: San Secondo Martire, Vallo Torinese, Turin, Italy

Maria Orsola Bussone (2 October 1954 – 10 July 1970) was an Italian Roman Catholic and a member from the Focolare Movement. Bussone's involvement in her adolescence in parish activities led her to Catholic Action as well as to other movements that she served as an active participant; she learnt the guitar and liked sports and music which she engaged in with her close friends. But those who knew her attested to her deep spiritual desires which she found sated in the Focolore Movement that she first came into contact with in the late 1960s. Bussone desired to act as a vessel for the goodness of God and desired that He would "…use me as He wants". Bussone died in an accident in 1970 and there were immediate calls to launch a process for beatification due to the impact she had made on local communities. On 18 March 2015 Pope Francis declared her to be Venerable .

== Life ==
Maria Orsola Bussone was born on 2 October 1954 in Vallo Torinese in Turin in the home of her maternal grandmother at 10:30pm as the first of two children to Umberto and Luigina; her brother Giorgio (b. 7.5.1957) followed. Her father owned a car repair office and her mother was a basic tailor (a "sarta"). Father Giuseppe Michelotti baptized her on 10 October.

Bussone attended kindergarten under the Cottolengo Sisters at Monasterolo Casotto and was at school in Vallo from 1 October 1960 until 21 June 1965. Bussone made her First Communion on 23 April 1961 and received her Confirmation on 11 July 1965.

In this time she loved the pop music of the 1960s and served as an active participant in the Catholic Action movement and the Maria Goretti Youth Group at the San Secondo Martire parish; she was also interested in peaceful student protests and viewed them as a democratic tool. Her love for sports and nature (activities such as skiing and skating) was also noted and she and her friends often spent time doing various sporting activities. High school began in autumn 1965 and concluded in summer 1968 (at the Federico Albert Institute in Lanzo under the nuns) when she began school in another place (in October 1968 at the Galileo Ferraris State High School in Cirié travelling there via bus). In 1969 she won a national competition for an essay entitled "The European Community" and she was rewarded with a trip to Brussels as well as to Strasbourg and Luxembourg. In 1968 she began to learn the guitar and to sing at a music school in Turin.

In 1966 she attended a retreat in Lanzo and the preacher Vincenzo Chiarle gave a sermon that affected Bussone and inspired her to attend similar retreats to broaden her spiritual horizons. Bussone attended a congress of the Focolare Movement for the first time from 3–5 June 1967 in Rocca di Papa and it had a profound effect on her to the point that she desired to join them as a means of strengthening her own faith and her own activism. En route home from that congress she and her friends stopped over in Loppiano in Florence. Since her childhood she attended with great participation to the activities in her parish and could be present to several meetings of children and adolescents in the Gen Movement which was the Youth Branch to the Focolare Movement. The first one she attended was in April 1968 at the invitation of Father Vincenzo Chiarle. The charism of that movement impressed her to the point that in a letter sent to Chiara Lubich, the founder, said that she wanted to inspire all her life unconditional love towards other people letting "God use me as He wants" as a tool to bring others closer to Him.

Seven months into 1970 she – who liked to sing with other adolescents in her parish and liked the guitar – went on a trip near Venice as an animator in the parish school-camp located at Ca' Savio alongside her brother Giorgio. It was during her time there that a trivial accident caused her death; she died of an electrical discharge while she dried her hair with a defective hair-dryer] as she prepared to attend Mass. Her cousin Marisa entered the room around 8:00pm to find Bussone on the ground and inert though artificial respiration and heart massage failed to prevent her death. Bishop Livio Maritano presided over her funeral on 13 July which saw 30 priests attend as well as more than 2000 people from 50 different parishes. Since 2 October 2004 her remains have been housed at the San Secondo Martire parish church.

== Beatification process ==
The beatification process commenced under Pope John Paul II on 17 July 1997 after the Congregation for the Causes of Saints issued the nihil obstat ("nothing against") and titled Bussone a Servant of God. The Congregation for the Causes of Saints validated Bussone's cause on 15 June 2001 prior to receiving the positio dossier in 2003. Bussone was declared to be Venerable on 18 March 2015 after Pope Francis confirmed that she had lived a life of heroic virtue. The postulator for this cause is Waldery Hilgeman.
