= Youth for a United World =

Youth for a United World (Y4UW) (formerly Young People for a United World or YPUW (Giovani Per Un Mondo Unito) is a group of young people of different races, cultures and beliefs committed to living for a United World. Y4UW was first launched in 1985 at a Focolare youth event known as a Genfest. The group was founded by Chiara Lubich of the Focolare Movement. Since 1996 the Y4UW have organised an annual worldwide event known as United World Week (formerly known as World Unity Week). The 2007 World Unity Week took place between October 14 and 21.

After a period of quiescence, the movement renewed its activities in 2011 after John Paul II's beatification, and at the 2012 Genfest in Budapest it was launched the United World Project, which was upgraded in time at the 2018 Genfest (Pathways for a United World) and at the 2024 Genfest where the United World Communities were launched. These are the key action performed by the Youth for a United World along with other youngsters and adults locally and globally.
