= Daniela Zanetta =

Italian Venerable

Venerable Daniela Zanetta
- Born: 15 December 1962; Maggiora, Novara, Italy
- Died: 14 April 1986 (aged 23); Maggiora, Novara, Italy

Daniela Zanetta (15 December 1962 – 14 April 1986) was an Italian member of the Focolare Movement in the Roman Catholic Church. From her birth she suffered from a rare skin disease that weakened her over time and which would cause skin tears and blistering. Her condition also forced frequent visits to the hospital and blood transfusions. Zanetta tried to put her illness behind her (offering her sufferings to God) so that she could live a normal adolescent life with her friends and in her free time collaborated with her local parish. Zanetta (since 1973) worked with the Focolare Movement that she joined after being drawn to their charism and that of its founder, Chiara Lubich.

Zanetta's beatification process commenced in late 2004, and she became titled as a Servant of God. The cause culminated on 23 March 2017 after Pope Francis acknowledged that she lived a life of heroic virtue and so named her as venerable.

== Life ==
Daniela Zanetta was born in Maggiora in Novara on 15 December 1962 as the eldest of three children to the middle-class and devout Carlo Zanetta (1936/7-26.6.2017) and Lucia Villa. Her brothers born after her were Fabrizio (b. 1967) and Emanuele (c. 1973) and a paternal uncle was Gino. Zanetta was born nine months following her parents' marriage though upon her birth was hospitalized once the midwife noticed a strange mark on the infant's leg. The doctors diagnosed this as a rare skin condition that had been seen in Italian infants six times in the past in which not a lot was known about it. The doctors predicted that she would not last the week and so she was baptized at once before being placed with her mother in a quarantined area because it was believed that the infant could be infectious.

In her childhood she was known for having achieved good results at school and was seen as a bright student. But in her fifth grade she suffered a hand and leg paralysis and the beginning of pyorrhea that required urgent treatment and also led to some of her teeth needing to be extracted. Zanetta served as a leader in a local parish group consisting of adolescents as she was at the time and also collaborated in other parish initiatives that included visiting ill children in hospital. Her free time was spent with her friends as she tried to put her condition past her though such activities were often interrupted due to frequent medical treatment or hospital visits. Her condition did make her prone to sudden hospitalization (such as when suffering severe anemia) and sometimes blood transfusions which weakened her. Zanetta often needed doses of medication in order to regulate the disease and her eyes would redden due to the condition.

In 1973 she had her first encounter with the Focolare Movement that Chiara Lubich had founded and she ended up becoming a member in the movement. Zanetta would maintain correspondence with Lubich on some occasions. Her condition allowed to appreciate the goodness of life even if there was suffering in it. This manifested when she learned about a conference of Italian doctors who were advocating for euthanasia. Zanetta opposed euthanasia (and also abortion) and wrote a response on 4 November 1984 to the local magazine Famiglia Cristiana urging people to see the goodness of all life despite its occasions of suffering. From 26 October 1983 until her death she kept a journal in which all her thoughts were written to Jesus Christ detailing her spiritual reflections. Zanetta also met Pope John Paul II in Arona in November 1984 who embraced her and she later received the Eucharist from him during the papal Mass.

In 1984 she had a surgical procedure before doctors suggested that she be cared for at home since the disease was too advanced for doctors to be able to do more for her. Zanetta did not leave home much following this though did have doctors continuing to assist her at home. Doctor Cavagnino - who aided her around this stage - said that she had the "precise and determined will to live" and that she "was bursting with love for others". In her final months she often wrote articles and reflections for her parish bulletin. Her condition worsened in February 1986 and she would later predict to her mother that she would die in April and even gave her three dates (she predicted 7 and 21 in addition to 14 when she did die). Zanetta managed to inform her parents on 10 April 1986 of how best to distribute her savings to the poor despite it being a modest amount. Zanetta received the Eucharist on 13 April and said (a few times): "Thank you, thank you for everything" before she entered into a coma. Zanetta regained consciousness the following evening at 7:50pm and died smiling with her parents and brothers at her side at 10:10pm on 14 April 1986.

== Beatification process ==
The beatification process opened on 28 September 2004 after the Congregation for the Causes of Saints issued the nihil obstat ("no objections") edict and titled Zanetta as a Servant of God. The cause opened in the Novara diocese under Bishop Renato Corti on 17 October 2004 in a diocesan process that lasted until 29 April 2006 collecting documentation and witness interrogatories (including from her relatives). The documentation was sent to the Congregation for the Causes of Saints in Rome who issued a decree on 22 February 2008 validating the process. The postulation (compiled and submitted the positio to the Congregation in 2014 for evaluation. Nine theologians issued their approval to the cause in late 2016 while the congregation's members approved it some short months later. Zanetta became titled as venerable on 23 March 2017 after Pope Francis signed a decree that acknowledged that Zanetta had practiced heroic virtue throughout her life. The postulator for this cause is Francesca Consolini.
