= Jerzy Ciesielski =

Polish civil engineer (1929–1970)

Venerable Jerzy Ciesielski
- Born: 12 February 1929; Kraków, Małopolskie, Second Polish Republic
- Died: 9 October 1970 (aged 41); Nile River, Egypt

Jerzy Ciesielski (12 February 1929 – 9 October 1970) was a Polish Roman Catholic from Kraków and a member of the Focolare Movement. Ciesielski was married and was also a close personal friend of Karol Józef Wojtyła – the future Pope John Paul II. Ciesielski worked as a professor and was a civic engineer himself and died in an accidental shipwreck in the Nile River.

Ciesielski's beatification cause started under John Paul II in 1992 and the confirmation of his heroic virtue allowed for Pope Francis to name him as venerable on 17 December 2013.

== Life ==
Jerzy Ciesielski was born on 12 February 1929 in Kraków to Philip Ciesielski and Maria Tatarczany; his older brother was Roman (1924–2004) who became a professor of civil engineering.

Ciesielski was a civil engineer and worked as a professor at the Tadeusz Kościuszko University of Technology as well as at the University of Khartoum. Ciesielski loved handball as well as canoeing and camping and rowing and was known for being an avid sportsman. He was a close personal friend of Karol Józef Wojtyła – the future Pope John Paul II – and the two were close for decades until Ciesielski's death. The two first met while he was a student and the then Father Wojtyła invited him to join his youth groups out in the country alongside other students and this was how he met his future wife who would later recall: "Father Karol came with us on trips to concerts, to the theatre and the cinema ... we talked during excursions, around the fire and at organized meetings which took place in our homes".

He married Danuta Plebańczyk on 29 June 1957 in a marriage that Bishop Wojtyla officiated at. The couple went on to have three children. In 1968 he first came into contact with the Focolare Movement and he became quite impressed with their mode of evangelical life that he and Doctor Giuseppe Santanché (part of the Italian branch) went to Cardinal Wojtyła for his blessings and also in the hopes of allowing for a Polish-based branch. He joined Focolare in the summer of 1969 after a week-long vacation he spent in Zakopane. In October 1969, he accepted the position as a visiting lecturer at the University of Khartoum.

Ciesielski died on 9 October 1970 on the Nile River in a shipwreck. His children Kasia and Piotr also died in that accident while his wife was at their hotel it occurred. Cardinal Wojtyła returned from Rome when he heard about what had happened and presided at the funerals for the three. Ciesielski's remains were relocated in 1998 to the Church of St. Anne, Krakow in Kraków.

== Beatification process ==
The beatification process commenced in Kraków in a diocesan process that Cardinal Franciszek Macharski inaugurated on 31 December 1985 and closed later on 29 May 1990; the formal introduction came John Paul II on 7 February 1992, after the Congregation for the Causes of Saints issued the nihil obstat to the cause and titled Ciesielski as a Servant of God. Theologians voiced their assent to the dossier's contents on 25 September 2012 as did the members of the Congregation on 17 December 2013. Pope Francis named Ciesielski as venerable on 17 December 2013 after confirming that he had lived a life of heroic virtue.
