= Economy of Communion =

- Formation: 1991; 35 years ago
- Founder: Chiara Lubich
- Founded at: São Paulo, Brazil
- Type: Movement
- Purpose: Encourage businesses to use their profits aid acute social problems
- Origins: The Christian Focolare Movement
- Region served: Worldwide
- Funding: Donations
- Website: www.edc-online.org

The Economy of Communion (EOC) is an initiative of the international Christian ecclesial and ecumenical Focolare Movement, and is an attempt to address acute social problems by creating businesses that are integral parts of their communities. The project requires member businesses to commit, after an appropriate investment in the sustainability of the business, a part of their profits to direct aid for those in need and another part toward nurturing a “culture of giving”.

The EOC presents examples of companies that are both successful global competitors as well as clear and intentional manifestations of “lived” faith in the business world. It was started by Chiara Lubich in May 1991, in São Paulo, Brazil, with the aim of building a human society where, following the example of the first Christian community in Jerusalem, "no one among them was in need".

The Economy of Communion is able to help those in need through their profits, as well as by how they treat their employees, clients, and the general public. Although the initiative started as a religious movement, in the core of the Focolare Movement, it is evolving into a humanitarian movement irrespective of religious allegiance.

== History ==
It was established in 1991. The Economy of Communion businesses began with the active participation of those in need — hundreds put their resources together, often selling chickens or other livestock to purchase "shares" for the initial capital.

Over 750 companies all over the world continue to work together to keep the Economy of Communion going to fulfill the needs of those around them.

== EOC Businesses ==
Since 1994, business centers called "productive" or "industrial" poles were established as a showcase of EoC business in a country.
