= Santa Scorese =

Italian Servant of God

Servant of God Santa Scorese
- Born: 6 February 1968; Bari, Italy
- Died: 16 March 1991 (aged 23); Palo del Colle, Italy

Santa Scorese (6 February 1968 – 16 March 1991) was an Italian student and Catholic activist, who was murdered for resisting harassment. As her beatification process has been opened, she is considered a servant of God by the Catholic Church.

== Life ==
Santa Scorese was born on February 6, 1968, in Bari, Italy. She was the daughter of Piero and Angela Scorese. She began her adherence to the Catholic faith at the Salesian Church of the Most Holy Redeemer, in her hometown. She maintained a deep Marian devotion, especially to the title of Mary Help of Christians. At age 15, she volunteered with the Italian Red Cross to care for young people with poliomyelitis and muscular dystrophy. She also helped in the development of civil protection in her city. She actively participated in the Gen Movement, the youth branch of the Focolare Movement, increasing her private spirituality. She also attended the Militia Immaculatae in Palese village. Among its various activities, it is also worth mentioning the assistance to elderly people interned in nursing homes and orphan children interned in institutions.

After finishing high school at the "Orazio Flacco" school in Bari, she enrolled in a pedagogy course at a local university.

In 1987, her family moved to Palo del Colle, a town a few kilometers from Bari. In the local parish, Scorese distinguished herself as a Catechist, on the pastoral council, in the choir, and as a member of Catholic Action. She also volunteered for the Associazione Italiana per la donazione di organi - AIDO, so that, after his death, her organs could be donated to people who needed a transplant.

She kept her spiritual journal, where she jotted down thoughts about his personal and vocational life. On November 17, 1987, she wrote the following passage:

"One thing I discovered: that God is truly the only unshakable fixed point in each of our lives. I feel that now, despite the turmoil that is inside me, his presence gives me tranquility and confidence, confidence that I am not alone, that He still loves me, even with my limitations, and I also feel the need to choose Him every day. days as the most important thing to me, it's worth fighting, suffering and dying."

In the year 1988, a young psychopath, who randomly overheard her proclaiming a Bible reading during a celebration at the Bari Cathedral, began obsessively following Scorese around everywhere. On one occasion, she was almost the victim of sexual violence, which she barely managed to escape. Scorese is then obliged to always be accompanied when leaving the house, at a time when the crime of stalking was still not taken seriously by the Italian authorities.

According to Scorese, her pursuer claimed to have told her that he would only leave her alone after she renounced her faith and the church. She refused. She was then threatened with a note left on her doorstep that read:

"Either mine or nobody's, and not God's."

Understanding the seriousness of the threats, she took the case to the knowledge of her spiritual director who advised her:

"Know that, whatever happens, choose God".

Despite subpoenas, on the night of March 15, 1991, her stalker was hidden waiting for her at her doorstep. When he saw Scorese, he lunged at her and struck her with fourteen stabs in the throat, in the chest, in the stomach. The mother watched the scene from the balcony screaming. Quickly her father ran to the street to help her. She was even taken to the Polyclinic of Bari so that she could receive medical help, but the seriousness of the injuries ended her life in the early morning of March 16, 1991. Her last words were of forgiveness to the man who killed her. Her funeral was filled with a crowd of young people and colleagues who worked with her in pastoral activities and who came to pay their respects. She is buried in the Palo del Colle cemetery.

== Beatification process ==
On April 5, 1998, during the celebrations of the XIII World Youth Day, Andrea Mariano Magrassi, at the time Archbishop of the Bari-Bitonto, initiated the cause of beatification of Santa Scorese in the form of martyrium in odium fidei, naming Father Vito Bitetto as postulator. The archdiocesan phase of the process ended on September 7, 1999, and the inquiry was handed over to the Dicastery for the Causes of Saints on October 18.

== Exteranal links ==
- Hagiography Circle
