= Vallo Torinese =

- Comune
- Comune di Vallo Torinese
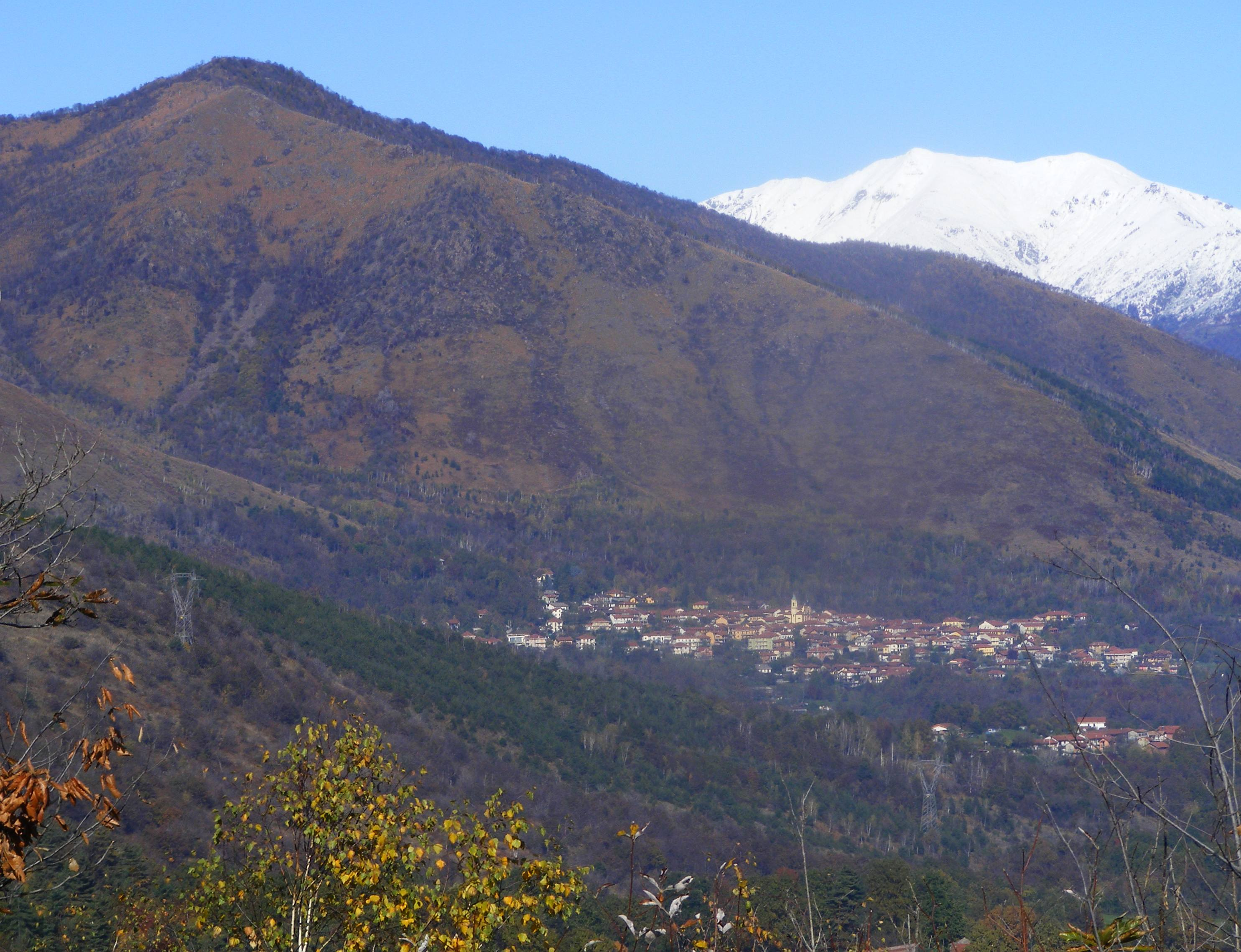

- Location within Italy Location within Piedmont
- Coordinates: 45°13′N 7°30′E
- Country: Italy
- Region: Piedmont
- Metropolitan city: Turin (TO)
- Frazioni: Gaiera, Spagna

Government
  - Mayor: Alberto Colombatto

Area
  - Total: 6.2 km^{2} (2.4 sq mi)
- Elevation: 508 m (1,667 ft)

Population (31 December 2014)
  - Total: 780
  - Density: 130/km^{2} (330/sq mi)
- Demonym: Vallesi
- Time zone: UTC+1 (CET)
  - Summer (DST): UTC+2 (CEST)
- Postal code: 10070
- Dialing code: 011
- Patron saint: St. Secundus
- Saint day: 26 August
- Website: Official website

Vallo Torinese is a comune (municipality) in the Metropolitan City of Turin in the Italian region Piedmont, located in the Val Ceronda about 25 kilometres (16 mi) northwest of Turin.
