= Igino Giordani =

Italian politician and Servant of God

Servant of God Igino Giordani
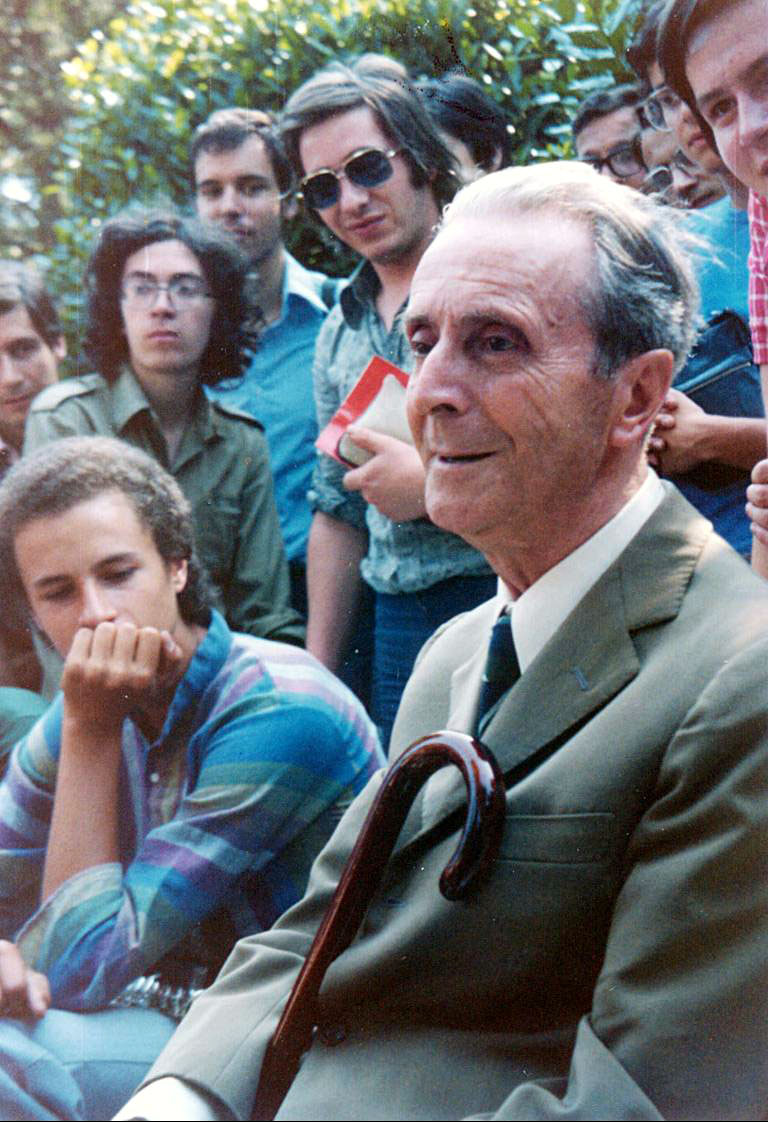
- Giordani in the 1970s
- Born: 24 September 1894; Tivoli, Lazio, Italy
- Died: 18 April 1980 (aged 85); Rocca di Papa, Italy

Igino Giordani (Hyginus Giordani; 24 September 1894 – 18 April 1980) was an Italian politician, writer and journalist, born at Tivoli. He was also a significant figure in the Focolare Movement.

== Biography ==
=== Early life ===
Igino was the first of six children of Mariano and Ursula Antonelli. In 1900 he began elementary school, on completion of which he apprenticed as a stone mason, in the footsteps of his father. A man for whom he'd done some work, paid for him to attend the Diocesan Seminary at Tivoli. He did his baccalaureate and attended the Faculty of Humanities at the University of Rome.

During World War I, Giordani was a second lieutenant, on the Isonzo River in the 111th Infantry Regiment and in 1916 was severely injured and rushed to the hospital, where he completed his degrees in literature and philosophy. Upon gaining his Bachelor in letters degree, he started to teach and at the same time began the first collaborations and contributions to reviews, magazines and newspapers.

On 2 February 1920, he married Mya Salvati at Tivoli and moved to Rome. They had four children: Mario, Sergio, Brando and Bonizza (Ganjawala Aragno). In the autumn, he met Luigi Sturzo and joined the Italian People's Party. In October he wrote his first political articles for Il Populo Nuovo , its weekly newspaper. Giordani became editor in 1924.

After a specialized course in Bibliography and Library Studies in the United States, where he became a Tertiary of the Dominican Order in 1928, he was hired as a Librarian at the Vatican Library. He was the editor of one of the first organic manuals of cataloguing of its printed works and handwritten manuscripts. He also directed the journal Fides. In that same year, he took special care of Alcide De Gasperi, who had been recently released from prison, and removed the harassment by the police. Igino Giordani recalled his intervention with Benito Mussolini:

I remember that I went from Jesuit Father Tacchi Venturi, who enjoyed considerable credit with Il Duce, and begged him to intervene and subsequently De Gasperi was left in peace. I was told that, working on the conscience of Mussolini, he was surprised and that even De Gasperi had been astonished; However, Mussolini had given the order to leave him in peace.

— Igino Giordani in the interview about De Gasperi released to Historia

On 2 June 1946, he was elected to the constituent Assembly of Italy for the district of Rome, and in August succeeded Guido Gonella in the management of the magazine Il Populo (1946-1947). In November of the same year, he was elected to the City Council (or Commune) of Rome.

=== Focolare ===
On 17 September 1948, at Montecitorio, he met Chiara Lubich and thereafter shared the ideals of the Focolare Movement, which she founded in 1943. Igino Giordani was the first married layman to take the promises of consecration to God in the Focolare Movement. He greatly appealed to the founder Chiara Lubich with all of his experience in the political and Christian sphere, with his familiarity with the realities of married life, being a family man, as well as an educator. She says that she "saw in him all of humanity"; she regarded him as 'a seed for all the lay vocations’ within the Focolare Movement, beginning with him the ‘Gen’ (a young people movement, the "new generation"), but "saw" in his figure even the priests, religious and young seminaries and novices who were to join the Movement. She saw in him "this very humanity summed up and renewed by the ideal of unity'; He was 'Foco', the ‘Fire' of the movement, for she considered him invested with a real charism for the movement. For all this, shortly after the death of Igino, Chiara declared him 'co-founder' of the movement along with the priest Pasquale Foresi and the German Bishop, Klaus Hemmerle.

He was one of the authors of the first bill on conscientious objectors, in 1949. Then, in 1953, he resigned from politics and was an employee of the Osservatore Romano and Il Populo. He was engaged in intense cultural activity during this period.

Through his books and his various activities as a journalist, he anticipated in the years before the Second Vatican Council some topics on the spirituality of the family and the role of the laity in the Church. For this reason, he is often remembered as a precursor of the Conciliar renewal.

He continued as an important worker in the Focolare Movement:

- In 1959, he was appointed editor of the Città Nuova.
- In 1961, he was placed at the head of ‘Centro Uno’, an ecumenical movement.
- In 1965, he was appointed President of the International Institute Mystici corporis in Loppiano.

After the death of his wife, and with the consent of his children, he lived the last seven years of his life in a "Focolare" community at Rocca di Papa.

His work and his ideals are perpetuated by many associations that are named in his honour.

His cause for beatification is currently being promoted, and his cause was completed in its Diocesan phase on 27 September 2009. The postulator of the cause is Waldery Hilgeman.

== Works ==
The bibliographic entry written by Thomas Sally and published in Giordani segno dei tempi nuovi, Rome, 1994, pp. 175–192, contains 104 titles including essays and translations in addition to a listing of minor essays published as pamphlets or serials and the originals are preserved in the Archives of the Igino Giordani Center at Rocca di Papa. Listed here are some of the most important titles:

- Rivolta cattolica, Turin, Gobetti, 1925 (later editions of 1945, 1962, 1997);
- Le due città: religione e politica nella vicenda delle liberta umane, Rome, Città Nuova Editrice, 1961;
- Segno di contraddizione, Brescia, Morcelliana, 1933, (successive editions 1934, 1941, 1944, 1964);
- La repubblica dei marmocchi, Rome, Casa Ed. Pro Familia, 1940, (successive editions 1940, 1963, 2003);
- La rivoluzione cristiana, Rome, Città nuova, 1969;
- Famiglia comunità d'amore, Rome, Città nuova, 1969, (successive editions 1991, 1994);
- Pensiero sociale della Chiesa oggi, Rome, Città nuova, 1974;
- Diario di fuoco, Rome, Città nuova, 1980 (successive editions 1985, 1990, 1992, 1999, 2001);
- Memorie di un cristiano ingenuo, Rome, Città nuova, 1981 (successive editions 1984, 1994);
- Il laico chiesa: la vocazione dei laici. Pagine scelte, edited by Tommaso Sorgi, Rome, Città nuova, 1987, (successive editions 1988);

== Legacy ==
A street in Rome, as well as one in Tivoli, Via Igino Giordani, is named for him. Sorocaba, Brazil has a Rua Igino Giordani.

== See also ==
- Focolare Movement
- Chiara Lubich
- List of peace activists

== Bibliography ==
- Tommaso Sorgi, Giordani segno di tempi nuovi, Rome, Città nuova, 1994, with a rich and comprehensive bibliography in the Appendix;
- Tommaso Sorgi, Un'anima di fuoco: profilo di Igino Giordani, 1894-1980, 2nd ed., Rome, Città Nuova, 2003;
