= Equal Opportunities Commission =

Equal Opportunities Commission may refer to:

- Equal Opportunities Commission (Hong Kong)
- Equal Opportunities Commission (United Kingdom)

== See also ==
- Australian Human Rights Commission, originally the Human Rights and Equal Opportunity Commission
- United States Equal Employment Opportunity Commission
