= Estonian Orthodox Church =

Estonian Orthodox Church may refer to:

- Estonian Apostolic Orthodox Church, an autonomous church subordinate to the Ecumenical Patriarchate of Constantinople
- Estonian Orthodox Church of the Moscow Patriarchate, a semi-autonomous diocese of the Russian Orthodox Church
- Eastern Orthodoxy in Estonia, the development of Eastern Orthodox Christianity in Estonia
