= Focolare Movement =

Christian new religious movement

- Established: 1943; 83 years ago
- Type: Roman Catholic new religious movement
- Purpose: Universal brother/sisterhood
- Headquarters: Via Frascati, 306; 00040 Rocca di Papa; Rome; Italy
- Region served: Worldwide, 182 nations
- Founder: Chiara Lubich
- President: Margaret Karram
- Main organ: Città Nuova, 37 editions worldwide
- Website: www.focolare.org

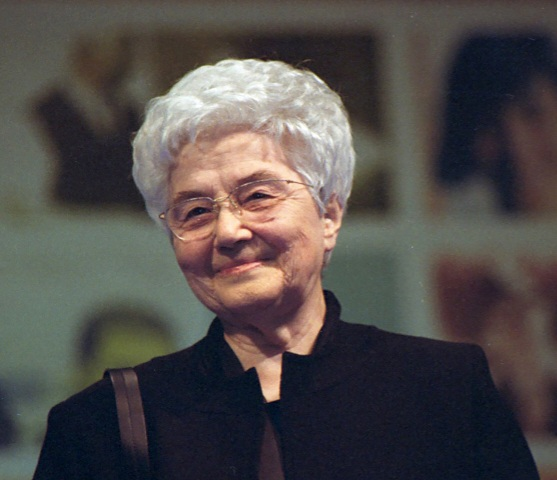
Chiara Lubich, founder of the Focolare Movement

The Focolare Movement is an international organization of spiritual and social renewal and Christian new religious movement that promotes the ideals of unity and universal brother/sisterhood grounded in the Golden Rule. It was founded by then elementary school teacher Chiara Lubich in 1943 in Trento, Northern Italy, as a Roman Catholic lay movement; it remains largely Roman Catholic but includes and sympathizes with other Christian denominations, other religions and non-religious people.

The Focolare Movement is present in more than 180 nations, has over 140,440 members and more than 4 million sympathizers. The word "Focolare" is Italian for "family fireside".

While the term Focolare is the common sobriquet of the international organization, the International Association of the Faithful of Pontifical Right lists its official name as "Work of Mary", approved in 1990 as "Opus Mariae".

== Beginnings ==
In the Northern Italian city of Trento in 1943, in the climate of violence and hatred of the Second World War and Nazi Occupation of Northern Italy (under the puppet state known as Republic of Salò), the young elementary school teacher Chiara Lubich saw God's Love as the only thing that was not fallen in rubble. With a copy of the Gospel from her spiritual father, she and few girls, while sheltering during air raids, started to live each phrase for the day or for the week. Of the many phrases lived she and her companions got struck deeply by the Jesus' prayer "that they all may be One". That prayer, completed with the "key" to achieve unity, Jesus' outcry "My God, why have you forsaken me?", are "the two faces of the medal that forms the movement".

During the war this group of young girls and many others sequentially joined in helping those in the shelters and in the poorest parts of the town of Trento, sharing her vision that was later called "Ideal".

In the aftermath of the Second World War criticisms, misunderstandings and accusations began to spread against this new community in Trento. Living the Gospel, communicating experiences, sharing their few possessions and making unity their ideal, aroused suspicions of Protestantism or a new form of communism. Their radical way of living the Gospel that Chiara proposed attracted the accusation of "fanaticism", and the word "love", not customarily used in the Catholic sphere at that time, was likewise misunderstood.

In 1948, the Italian politician and journalist Igino Giordani, an Italian Republic Constitution father, member of the Italian Parliament and pioneer of ecumenism joined the group, bringing social unity and politics as new dimensions of the ideal. Giordani is one of the co-founders, along with Fr. Pasquale Foresi, who would work on the theological ground to answer the Catholic Church questions and later help found the movement's main journal, New City Press, in 1964.

The movement, even under adversities between 1949–50, spread rapidly throughout Northern Italy and across Europe, then worldwide. In 1958, members of the movement from Europe began to travel to other continents at the request of people who wanted to know more about it. In 1958, it reached various countries in South America, in 1961 North America, in 1963 Africa, in 1966 Asia and 1967 Australia.

Today it has 140,440 members in more than 180 countries. People more broadly involved in the movement are estimated by the Vatican at 4.5 million.

== Focolare towns ==
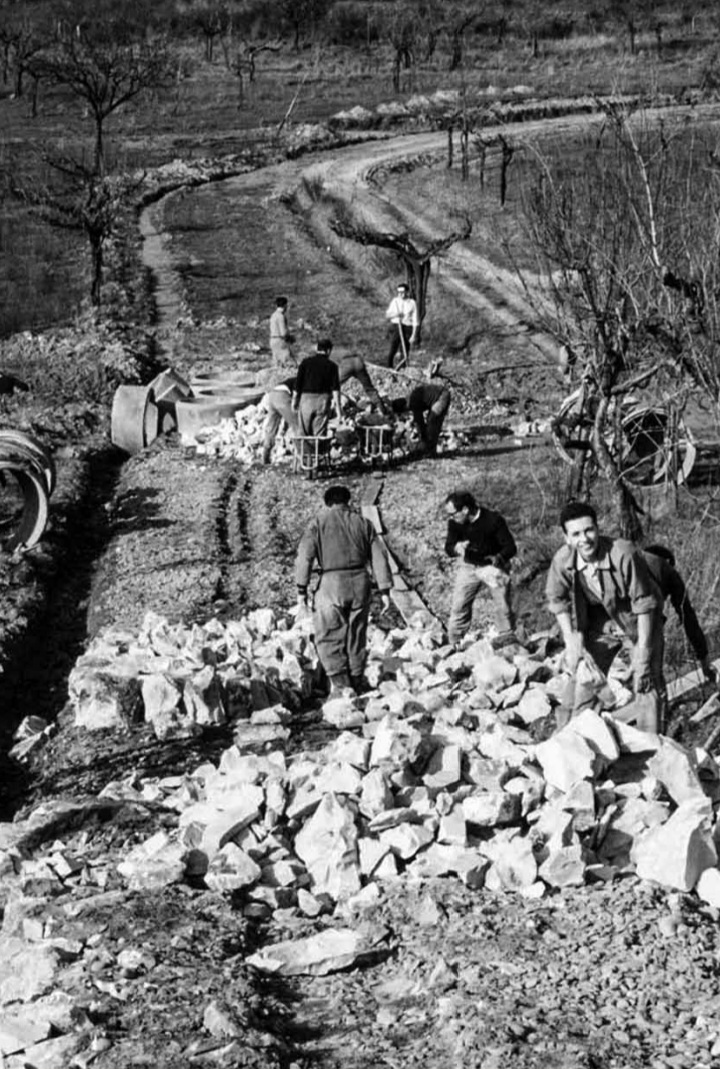
Building the road to the future Focolare town Loppiano

After 1949, summer vacations together in Fiera di Primiero in the Dolomite Mountains and many other places in northern Italy saw large numbers incoming for the retreats. Some priests and religious with a variety of spiritualities were present even if the movement was not yet fully recognised by many churches, and by 1955 this gathering took on the name "Mariapolis", literally "City of Mary" since it was a place "to live like Mary".

The desire to share, materially, culturally, and spiritually, beyond the sole summer reached a focal point after Chiara's visit to the Benedictine Einsiedeln Abbey in Switzerland in 1962. The dream of permanent towns of brother/sisterhood, "simple houses, workplaces, schools—just like an ordinary town" began to take the first steps, and in 1964 Loppiano, the first permanent Mariapolis was built on land donated by Vincenzo Folonari, near Florence. It has grown to include 900 people of worldwide origins and diverse occupations, married and single, priests and religious, who work and study together and strive to live the ideal.

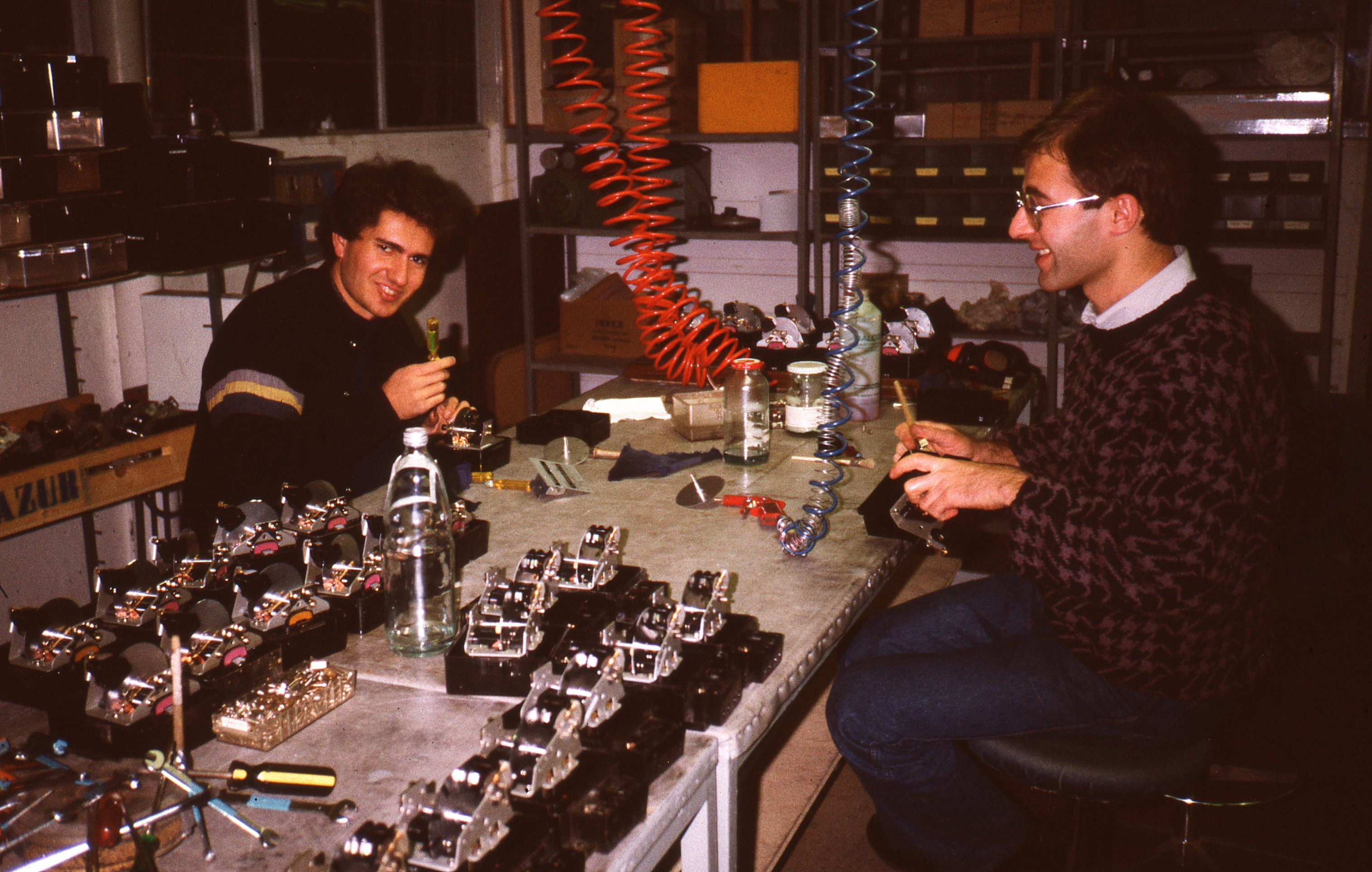
Communal electrical shop, Loppiano, 1989

According to the data published by the Focolare Movement, twenty-four other such towns have sprung up worldwide. Some have specific emphases: ecumenism (Ottmaring, Germany; Welwyn Garden City, Great Britain); ecology (Rotselaar, Belgium); interreligious dialogue (Tagaytay, Philippines); multi-ethnic harmony (Luminosa, New York; Faro, Križevci, Croatia); or inculturation (Fontem, Cameroon; Kenya; Ivory Coast). Others have the names of people who are linked to the history of the movement in a part of the world, such as Ginetta (Vargem Grande Paulista, Brazil), Renata (Loppiano, Italy), Piero (Nairobi, Kenya) or Lia (Chacabuco, Argentina). In these towns religious and cultural differences are peacefully present, according to the ideal of love that Chiara has always lived as the central bridge of the charism of unity.

== Development ==
In November 1956, an uprising of the Hungarian people was brutally suppressed. Chiara responded by calling for an army of volunteers for the cause of God, "volunteers of God": "A certain society has attempted to erase the name of God, the reality of God, the providence of God and the love of God from people's hearts. There has to be a society that can put God back in his rightful place (...). A society that witnesses to only one name: God." Thus, the "volunteers of God" came to life, the first of 18 branches within the Focolare Movement.

Groups met according to their area of engagement and, with Chiara's inspiration, began centers for politics, economy, medicine, and art. These later developed into a wider movement that Chiara launched in 1968 with the name "For a New Society" and later changed to "New Humanity.

The Focolare Movement has branched out to address a variety of groups including families, youth, and different religions. Special projects have sprung up within the movement, such as the "Abba" school, Young People for a United World (now Youth for a United World), Teens4unity, Economy of Communion (involving 800 companies), evangelism within small cities, social work, the Igino Giordani Centre, and 27 publishing houses. Pope Francis in praising Economy of Communion called on it to change "the rules of the game of the socio-economic system." John L. Allen Jr. has observed that it is hard to "pick a fight with a focolarino. They tend to be open, ego-free, and just relentlessly nice."

The president of the Focolare Movement, who is always a Catholic lay woman is Margaret Karram, who succeeded the second president (after Chiara Lubich) Maria Voce in 2021. In accordance of the female presidency there is a male vice-president, at this moment Jésus Moran.

== Thought and Charism ==
Love is stronger than everything and this is your faith, the source of inspiration for all that is done in the name of Focolare, all that you are, all that you do in the world.

— St. John Paul II during his visit to the Focolare headquarters in 1984

Since the late 1940s around Chiara Lubich many people saw her charisma as something different than similar branches of Christianity, such as the Third Order Franciscans of which she was initially a part. Thanks to the work of Pasquale Foresi, Giuseppe Maria "Peppuccio" Zanghì and since the 1990s the Abbà School a great number of people was involved in study and dissection of the theological, cultural and social implications of the charisma of unity.

Pope John Paul II described the Focolare Movement as a "small people, an expression of the great people of God, moving on towards the building of a civilization of love, towards the goal of a more united world. This movement has a specific spirituality, which is collective and also has its own well-defined culture".

Chiara said that "this is a Movement, whose main objectives and goals are these: God chosen in fact as an Ideal; love chosen as a lifestyle; unity which becomes the practice binding each person to God and people with one another."

Theologically the movement can be summed up on two pillars that could be defined as "Praxis of Nothingness, Jesus Forsaken, and Unity in Love (as in the Last Prayer) by keeping Jesus in the midst." These concepts are the theological core of the charisma of unity.

This thought is clearly slended towards universality grounded on the Golden Rule, and this can be seen by a strong presence in ecumenism, dialogue with believers and non-believers, international aid and adoptions and many other fields such as the collaboration with other lay organisations of the Catholic Church.

== Interreligious dialogue ==
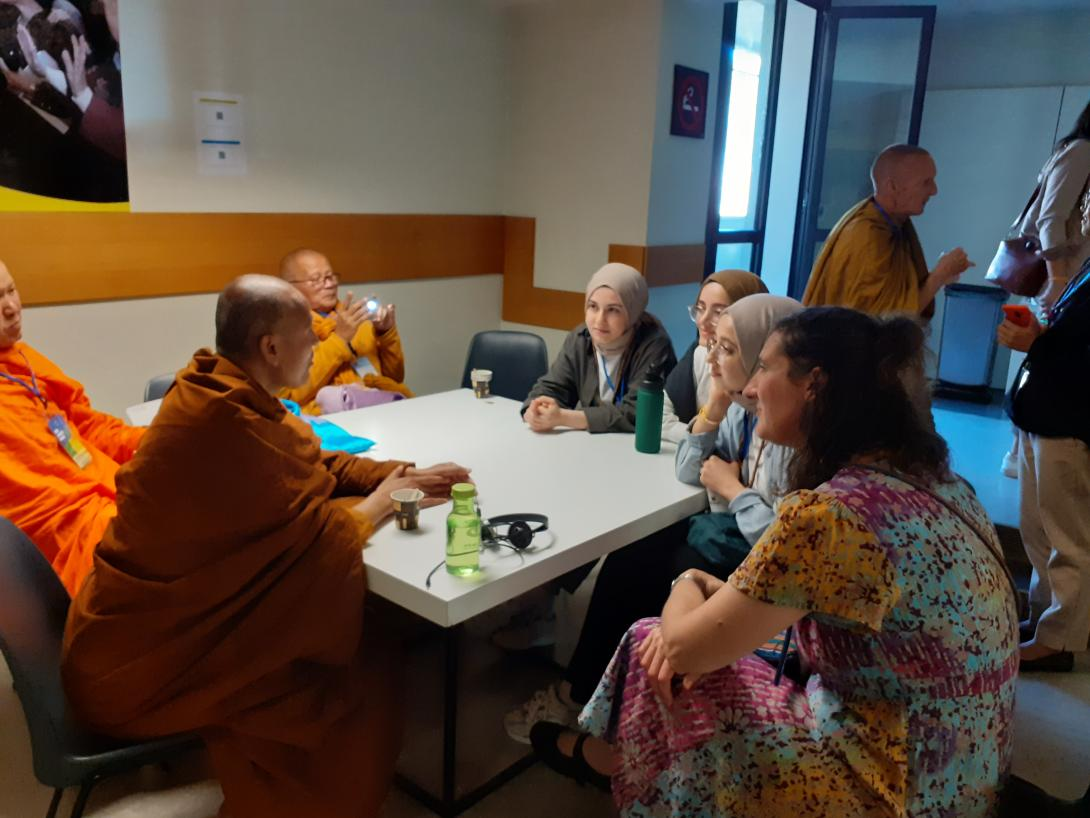
Interreligious dialogue at the International Mariapolis Center in Rome

Chiara Lubich possessed "an almost prophetic capacity to intuit and actualise beforehand the thought of the Pope", said in a letter Pope Benedict XVI read out by Secretary of State, Cardinal Tarcisio Bertone, at Chiara Lubich’s funeral Mass in 2008. Pope John Paul II put his finger on one example recognising "the radicalism of love of Chiara, of the Focolarini," – a "Gospel radicalism of love" – as an answer to what had long been his concern for a hate-dominated world. But beyond Christianity, Chiara Lubich’s spiritual experience of kenosis led her to be open to the presence of God in other religions, and in a spirituality of openness she started and pushed on dialogue. This in turn led people of other faiths to find a home in the Focolare movement.

While unity was in the Christian sphere the key attraction (for all Christians, since its source is in the Gospel of John), forsakeness/suffering was the appeal for dialogue with people of other faiths or with people without faith.

Today the Focolare Movements define 5 dialogues:

- First Dialogue, dialogue inside the Catholic Church realities in communion
- Second Dialogue, dialogue between the various churches of Christianity
- Third Dialogue, dialogue with anyone who believes in some spirituality/faith
- Fourth Dialogue, dialogue with anyone who does not believe in any spirituality/faith
- Fifth Dialogue, dialogue within the contemporary culture's challenges, risks and opportunities.

== Renewal ==
At a reorganizational meeting in 2014 newly elected council members had an average age 16 years younger than that of the previous council, and the 30 council members came from 20 countries. In Pope Francis' address to the reorganizational meeting, he said: "The Work of Mary, that everyone knows as the Focolare movement, was a little seed in the Catholic Church's womb, that in the course of the years has brought to life a tree which now extends its branches in all the expressions of the Christian family and also among members of different religions and among many who cultivate justice and solidarity together with the search for truth." Francis went on to describe elements of the movement as contemplation, going out to engage in dialogue and formation of youth. Of contemplation he said: "We need to contemplate God and the beauty of his love," keeping in mind that "to contemplate means to live together with brothers and sisters, breaking with them the bread of communion and fraternity," since "contemplation that leaves people outside is a lie, it is narcissism."

Les Jours, an online investigative news site, published a series of articles concerning abuse within the movement. In light of allegations of sexual abuse brought against Jean-Michel Merlin, a consecrated member in France, the Focolare Movement contracted with GCPS Consulting to look into the matter. In October 2020, three senior officials of the movement stepped down amid questions regarding their handling of complaints. Focolare subsequently initiated an internal investigation into the number of cases of claimed abuse.

== Publications ==
The Focolare magazine, entitled Città Nuova ("new city"), began at the 1956 Mariapolis from the desire of people to stay connected to the spirituality and the movement as a whole. In one of its first editorials, Chiara expressed her vision for it: "We would like to collect all the various experiences of people who are bringing unity all over the world (...) so that the good that one person does will become the common good and the common good will belong to each individual."

New City Press, established in 1964, is the official publishing house for the Focolare Movement, publishing books, periodicals, and e-books. Among its publications are the Spirituality of Unity series, featuring the works of founder Chiara Lubich, and Understanding the Scriptures, Bible commentaries by scholars such as Daniel J. Harrington, Dianne Bergant, Robert Karris, and Ronald Witherup. NCP publications include: the academic journal Sophia twice a year; three quarterlies – Gen's on ecclesial commitment as well as New Humanity, and Unity and Charisms; the bimonthly Teens for children; and the monthly periodicals Città Nuova (published in 38 different national or regional formats; known as New City in the UK, and as Living City in the US, where its editor is Jon M. Sweeney) with opinion and dialogue, Big Smart Kids including inserts for educators, and Gospel of the Day. Focolare also publishes Economy of Communion, a quarterly magazine and website.

== Members proposed for sainthood ==
During the short life of the Focolari Movement, many Catholic members have been proposed for sainthood status to the Dicastery for the Causes of Saints.

=== Blesseds ===
- Chiara Badano [Luce] (1971–1990), Young Layperson of Sassello; Member (Italy)

=== Venerables ===
- Jerzy Ciesielski (1929–1970), Married Layperson of Archdiocese of Kraków; Member (Poland-Egypt)
- Maria Orsola Bussone (1954–1970), Young Layperson of Archdiocese of Turin; Member (Italy)
- Daniela Zanetta (1962–1986), Young Layperson of the Diocese of Novara; Member (Italy); declared "Venerable": 23 March 2017
- Nguyễn Văn Thuận (1928–2002), Bishop of Nha Trang; Cardinal; Associate (Vietnam-Italy)

=== Servants of God ===
- Chiara Lubich [Silvia] (1920–2008), Layperson of the Diocese of Frascati; Founder of the Focolare Movement
- Igino Giordani [Foco] (1894–1980), Married Layperson of the Diocese of Frascati; Cofounder (Italy)
- Albertina Violi Zirondoli (1901–1972), Married Layperson of the Diocese of Fiesole; Consecrated Member (Italy)
- Alberto Michelotti (1958–1980), Young Layperson of the Archdiocese of Genoa; Member (Italy)
- Carlo Grisolia [Vir] (1960–1980), Young Layperson of the Archdiocese of Genoa; Member (Italy)
- Maria Cecilia Perrin de Buide (1957–1985), Married Layperson of the Archdiocese of Bahia Blanca; Member (Argentina)
- Margarita Bavosi [Luminosa] (1941–1985), Layperson of the Archdiocese of Madrid; Consecrated Member (Argentina-Italy)
- Renata Borlone (1930–1990), Layperson of the Diocese of Fiesole; Consecrated Member (Italy)
- Santa Scorese (1968–1991), Young Layperson of the Diocese of Bari-Bitonto; Associate; Martyr (Italy)
- Dario Porta (1930–1996), Priest of the Diocese of Parma; Member (Italy)
- Manuel Pascual Perrin (1925–2000), Married Layperson of the Archdiocese of Bahia Blanca; Member (Argentina)
- Ginetta Calliari (1918–2001), Layperson of the Diocese of Osasco; Consecrated Member (Italy-Brazil)
- Domenico Antonio Mangano (1938–2001), Married Layperson of the Diocese of Albano; Member of the Volunteers of God – Focolare Movement (Italy)

== Bibliography ==
- Bowie, Fiona (2003). "An anthropology of religious experience: spirituality, gender and cultural transmission in the Focolare movement". Ethnos. 68 (1): 49–72. doi:10.1080/0014184032000060362. ISSN 0014-1844. S2CID 144380573.
- Urquhart, Gordon (1999). The Pope's Armada: Unlocking the Secrets of Mysterious and Powerful New Sects in the Church. London: Bantam Press. ISBN 9780593033883.
- That All May Be One: Origins and Life of the Focolare Movement, New City Press, New York, 1969
