= Chiara Lubich =

Italian teacher and founder of the Focolare Movement (1920–2008)

Servant of God Chiara Lubich
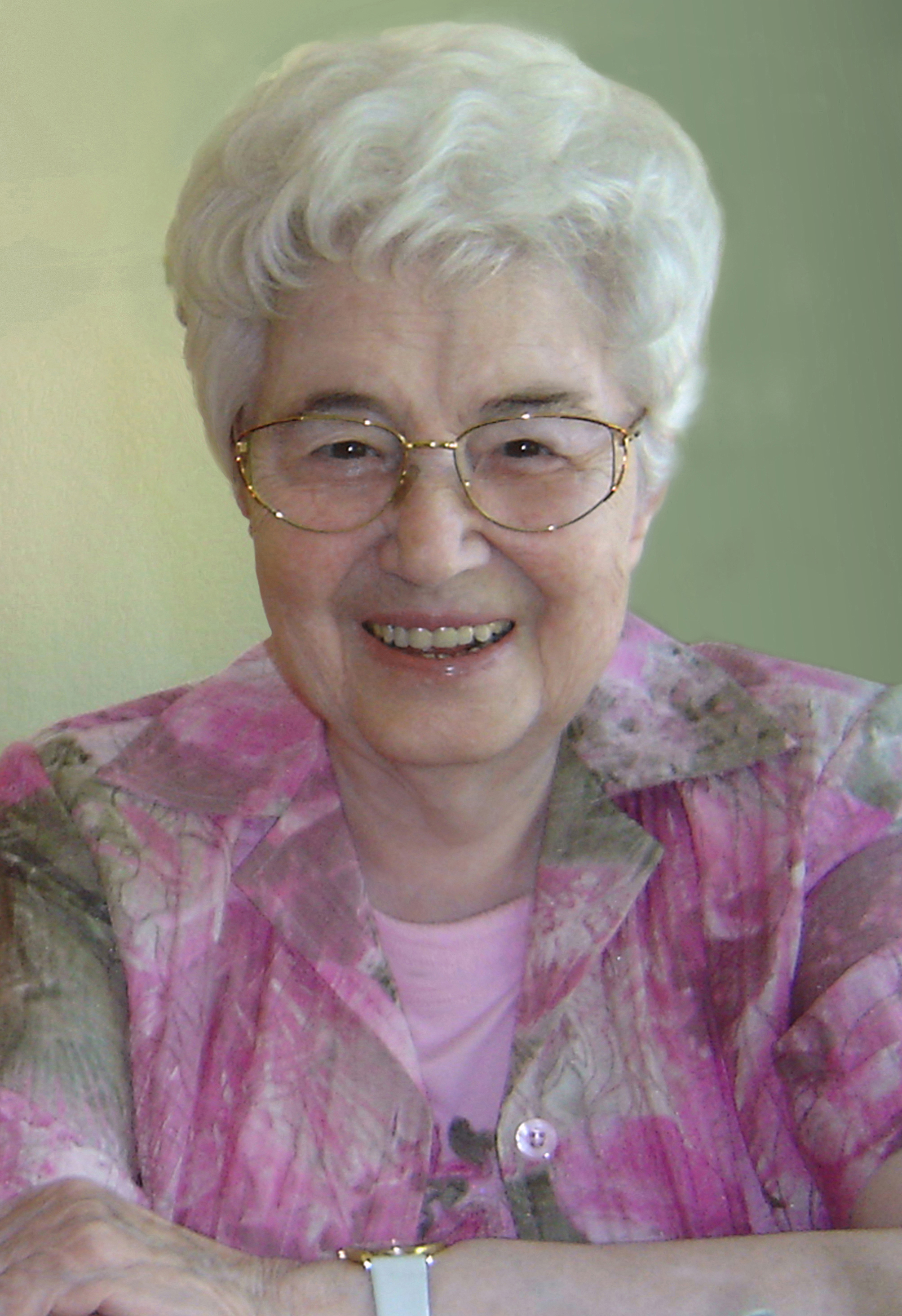
- Lubich, c. 2006
- Born: 22 January 1920; Trento, Italy
- Died: 14 March 2008 (aged 88); Rocca di Papa, Italy

Chiara Lubich (born Silvia Lubich; 22 January 1920 – 14 March 2008) was an Italian teacher and Catholic author who founded the Focolare Movement, which aims to bring unity among people and promote universal family.

Lubich is considered a notable figure in ecumenical, interreligious and intercultural dialogue. She received the UNESCO Prize for Peace Education in 1996 and the Council of Europe Human Rights Award in 1998.

== Early life ==
The second of four children, Lubich was baptised Silvia. Her mother Luigia Marinconz, was a devoted Catholic, while her father, Luigi, was a socialist and anti-fascist. She later took the religious name Chiara upon entering the Franciscan Third Order (1942–1949).

Luigi Lubich worked as a typesetter for the socialist newspaper Il Popolo, directed by Cesare Battisti. After the suppression of the newspaper by the Italian fascist regime, he opened an export business of Italian wines into Germany, but due to the crisis of 1929, he was forced to close it. Having refused to become a member of the National Fascist Party, he found it impossible to get work and had to resort to doing odd jobs to support his family. Thus, the family lived in financial hardship for years. Her mother and the local Sisters of the Child Mary provided her with a religious upbringing. At the age of 15, she joined the ranks of Catholic Action in Trento and soon became a diocesan youth leader.

=== Education and teaching career ===
Lubich attended a teachers' college and became a passionate student of philosophy. Her desire was to attend the Catholic University of Milan, but she failed to win a scholarship. Though initially distressed by this, she experienced an inner conviction that she later described as God telling her, "I will be your teacher". As soon as she graduated, she took jobs teaching in elementary schools in the valley regions around Trento (1938–39), and then in Cognola (1940–1943), a town close to Trento, in a school for orphans run by the Capuchins. In the autumn of 1943, she left teaching and enrolled at the Ca'Foscari University of Venice, continuing to give private lessons. However, due to the circumstances of the war, at the end of 1944, she had to interrupt her studies.

== Founding Focolare: 1942–1951 ==
Focolare was founded against the backdrop of World War II. Lubich took her inspiration from looking at Einsiedeln Abbey. During the war she came to a conviction centered on the idea of God as love, which she described as the origin of the movement. In autumn of 1942, in the wake of a simple conversation about the love of God with a Capuchin friar, Casimiro Bonetti, he proposed that Lubich enter the Franciscan Third Order. Drawn by Clare of Assisi, she took the name Chiara, which is Italian for Clare. Her experience of God's love was the topic of conferences she gave to the young women of the Third Order. Among them was Natalia Dallapiccola, who, at the age of 18, was the first to follow Lubich.

=== Lessons from the war ===
On 2 September 1943, Anglo-American forces began bombing Trento. As she and her first companions ran to the air-raid shelters, they took only a copy of the Gospel, which they read and tried to put it into practice. Following the armistice between Italy and the Allies, the territory around Trento was occupied by Nazi forces and annexed to the Third Reich. Her brother Gino joined the communist partisans and fought against the Nazi-fascist regime. In the summer of 1944, he was arrested and tortured. Amidst the uncertainty about the future and fear for life itself caused by the war, Lubich came to realize the transience of all things and that "only God remains". She became convinced that "the salvation of the twentieth century is love". She shared this view in letters she wrote to her relatives, to the young women of the Third Order, and to her colleagues. Soon other young women joined her in living what they called a "divine adventure".

On 7 December 1943, in the chapel of the Capuchin College, she took a vow of perpetual chastity.

=== A revolution born from the Gospel ===
Lubich and her early friends did relief work in the poorest sections of Trento. Donations of food, clothing and medicine increased as more people joined. Lubich made a plan, with the goal of “solving the social problems of Trento”. In 1947, it took shape as “Fraternity in action". In 1948 she wrote: "We have understood that the world needs to be healed by the Gospel because only the Good News can give back to the world the life it lacks. This is why we live the Word of Life (…). We have no other book except the Gospel, no other science, no other art. That is where life is!"

In February 1948, in an editorial signed by Silvia Lubich, which appeared in L'Amico Serafico, the magazine of the Capuchin Fathers, she announced the communion of goods to all those around her, following the example of the first Christians. After only a few months, close to 500 people were involved in a widespread sharing of material and spiritual goods.

=== The unity of the human family ===
At a time of uncertainty and worry about her future, when Lubich had no clear hopes for the future, she came up with the idea for this project:

One day I found myself with my new companions in a dark, candle-lit cellar, a book of the Gospel in hand. I opened it at random and found the prayer of Jesus before he died: ‘Father (...) that they may all be one’ (John 17:11). It was not an easy text for us to start with, but one by one those words seemed to come to life, giving us the conviction that we were born for that page of the Gospel.

Lubich interpreted the phrase "that they may all be one" as referring to the unity of all humankind, achievable, she believed, by embracing the cross. Lubich focused on “Jesus Forsaken”. Gradually she and her companions came to believe that in that moment Jesus had transformed all forms of pain and suffering into "new life" and healed all the traumas of division. Years later, she would affirm: "Jesus Forsaken won every battle in us, even the most terrible ones (...). But it is necessary to be madly in love with him, who is the synthesis of every physical or spiritual suffering, the remedy (...) for every pain of the soul".

"We experienced joy, new peace, the fullness of life, an unmistakable light. Jesus was fulfilling his promise: 'Where two or more are gathered in my name, I am there among them' (Matt 18:20). He is the one who binds us into unity with the Father, and into unity among us, the unity which had been impossible until now."

Lubich understood that the unity that she and her first companions were experiencing was destined for the whole world. In 1946 she already proposed that they aim at universal brotherhood, indicating the way that this can be done. "Look at all people as children of the one Father. Let our thoughts and the affection of our hearts go beyond m one Father: God".

While Lubich and her first companions believed they were simply living the Gospel, the phrases that were coming into relief formed the basis of what they called a spirituality of unity or "spirituality of communion". Lubich gradually deepened these principles in her spiritual writings.

=== A decisive choice ===
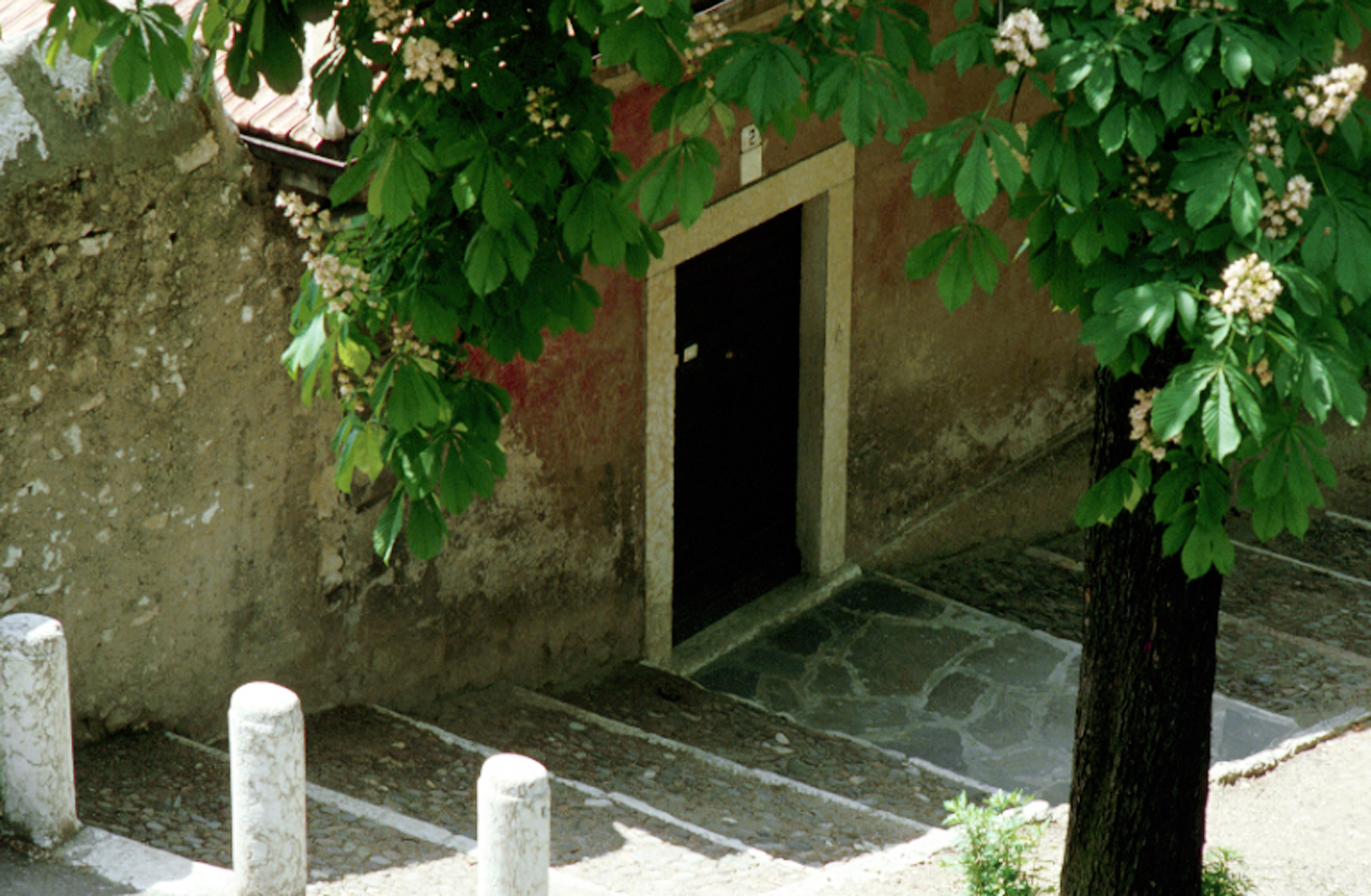
The first Focolare house at Piazza Cappuccini in Trento, Italy

On 13 May 1944, the city of Trento was subjected to heavy bombing. The Lubich home was also damaged to the point of being uninhabitable. The family decided to look for shelter in a mountain village, while Chiara made the difficult choice to stay in the city to support the increasingly numerous group of young women who were inspired by her actions and her words. While she was going through the streets, looking for her friends, a woman, distraught with grief, grabbed her by the shoulders, shouting at her that four of her family members had been killed. For Chiara, this was a call to set aside her own pain to take on the pain of humanity.

In the autumn of 1944, Chiara was offered a small apartment in Piazza Cappuccini, where she went to live with some of her companions. This would be the seed of a small and rather unique community. The warmth of their love earned them the nickname "focolare", the Italian word for hearth. Even though they had no intention of starting anything, this small household marked the first basic structure of the newly born Movement. It would constitute its heart, its backbone. In the autumn of 1948, a young electrician, Marco Tecilla, and a merchant, Livio Fauri, decided to follow Chiara's new communitarian way and formed the first men's focolare community. In 1953, the focolare household would acquire its definitive form when also married people became full members of the community while remaining faithful to the obligations of their married life. The first to follow this path was Igino Giordani, the pioneer for a vocation that would be followed by numerous married people who are eager for spiritual perfection.

=== Years of difficult trials ===
“Whoever listens to you listens to me” (Luke 10:16). This sentence from the Gospel of Luke motivated Chiara to go with her companions to see the bishop of Trento, Carlo De Ferrari. He listened to them, got more information about their life and then reassured them. He also confirmed that this was something new that was developing and should be separate from the Franciscan Third Order. In fact, on 1 May 1947, Archbishop De Ferrari approved the Statute of the Focolare of Charity – Apostles of Unity. In March 1949, a decree of the Vatican department for religious ratified the distinction of the Focolare of Charity from the Franciscan Third Order. The charges against them, however, did not cease. During the 1950s, when movements were a new phenomenon in the Church, certain Vatican offices regarded the Focolare Movement with suspicion. In 1951, the Holy Office (now known as the Congregation of the Doctrine of the Faith) began a long study and a series of interviews to test the young founder. During this time, it was uncertain whether the movement would be disbanded or approved.

=== Papal approvals ===
The trial came to an end gradually, starting with the first pontifical approval ad experimentum in 1962, during the pontificate of Pope John XXIII, at about the same time that he opened the Second Vatican Council. Further approval was given by Pope Paul VI in 1964. In 1990, Pope John Paul II approved the Statutes that outline the composite physiognomy of the Focolare Movement as it developed over the years. As early as 1984, John Paul II recognized in the charism of Chiara a "radicalism of love", juxtaposing it with that of Ignatius of Loyola and other founders. The following year, in answer to a question posed to him by Chiara, he gave his support to the idea that in the future the head of the Movement would always be a woman, even though Focolare includes priests, men and women religious, and bishops. His answer was: "Indeed! I see you [the Focolare] as an expression of the Church’s Marian profile". In that same year, John Paul II named her as a consultant for the Pontifical Council for the Laity. Chiara addressed the synods of the bishops in 1985, 1987 and 1999.

=== The meeting with Igino Giordani ===
Various circumstances led Chiara to move from Trento to Rome. Looking for help to find an apartment in postwar Rome, she asked for an appointment with Igino Giordani (1884–1980), a prominent figure in Parliament. The meeting took place on 17 September 1948. Giordani, who was married and father of four children, was a prolific author, journalist, pioneer of ecumenism, scholar and expert in the history of the Church, and therefore able to understand the novelty that the spirituality offered. At the age of 56, he decided there and then to follow her, while remaining with his family, but becoming a spiritual member of the community of consecrated virgins. He was the first in this vocation of “married Focolarini”, an original way of consecration open to married people, as individuals or as a couple. Giordani would also contribute greatly to the development of ecumenism within the Movement, as well as to the civic and social dimension of the spirituality, so much so that he was considered by Chiara co-founder of the Movement. The process of his beatification is currently underway.

=== A special period of light ===
After years of intense activity, in the summer of 1949, Chiara went with her companions for a period of rest to a town near Trento called Tonadico. It was a mystical experience and has since been referred to simply as "Paradise ’49". She understood more about God's plans for the Focolare Movement and its future developments. During those few months, Chiara constantly communicated with Igino Giordani, who had returned to Rome for his work. She would immediately share whatever she understood with the young women who were with her, in such a vital way that they had the impression of participating with her in the same experience. It was the founding experience of the new communitarian spirituality and the ecclesial reality that it would generate.

== Development ==
In September 1949, Chiara returned to Rome from the mountains and a new stage began. Before the year end, she met a young man from Pistoia (central Italy), Pasquale Foresi (1929–2015). He was destined to become one of Chiara's closest collaborators, whom she considered a co-founder, alongside Igino Giordani.

=== Mariapolis ===
Every summer between 1950 and 1959, in the mountain villages near Trento, people from all walks of life joined Chiara and the members of the movement to live this new lifestyle, while enjoying a holiday atmosphere together. They came from Italy, France and Germany, from other countries of Europe and other continents. The first multicultural scale model of a society renewed by the Gospel took shape spontaneously and was given the name "Mariapolis" ("city of Mary"). In 1953, among other politicians, Alcide De Gasperi, then Prime Minister of Italy, attended the Mariapolis. In 1959, over 10,000 people came to the Valley of Primiero from 27 nations, including Czechoslovakia, Brazil, and Taiwan. The following year, at the Mariapolis in Fribourg, Switzerland, Chiara spoke to a group of politicians of the day when all nations would live in unity, foreseeing "a new era": "The time has come when the homeland of others has to be loved as one’s own. Today the times require us to have the social responsibility to build up, not only our own country but that of others, too."

== A work "under construction" ==
Chiara often described herself as a simple instrument in the hands of the artist. After the pontifical approval in 1962, the movement began to develop at a surprisingly rapid rate, resulting in the formation of various branches for more committed members and of movements for wider outreach. Chiara repeated several times that she never had a plan or an agenda:

Yes, because the pen does not know what the author wants to write ... So, when God takes a person in his hands to produce a particular work within the Church, that person does not know what he or she will have to do. They are merely the tool, the instrument ... When this life started in Trento, I had no plan, no program. The idea of this Movement was in the mind of God, the project was in heaven. That’s how it was in the beginning, and that’s how it has been over all the years the Movement has developed.

=== Youth and the gospel revolution ===
In 1967, Chiara proposed to young people a revolution of love, based on the Gospel. She issued a strong appeal for young people of the world to unite. She pointed to a new model of person needed for this era, the "global person" with the whole world in their heart. In 1985, an even broader youth movement began, called "Youth for a United World" for young adults, while a year before, in 1984, Chiara had started "Teens for Unity", for teens and children to build peace everywhere and to spread a culture of giving.

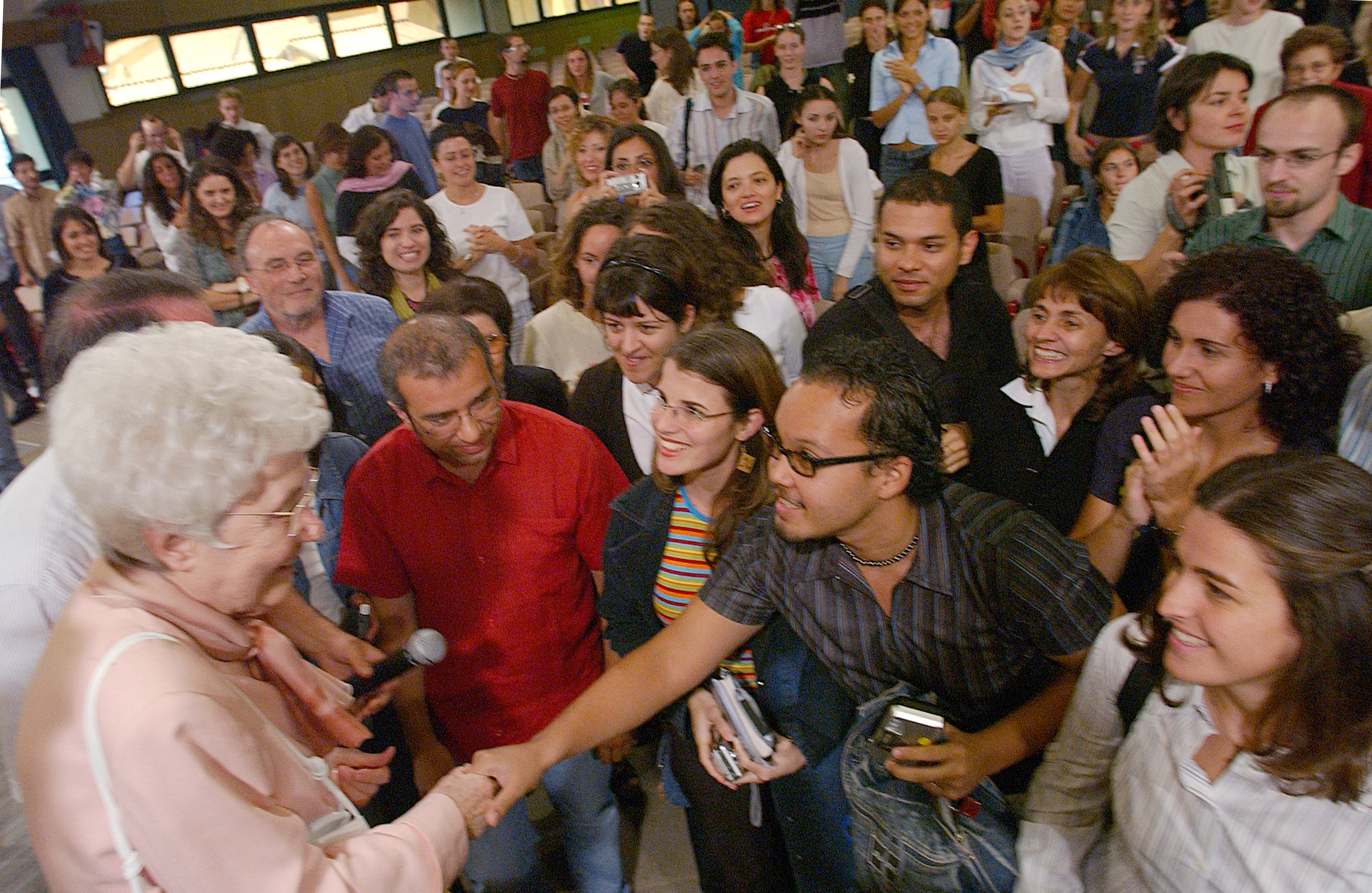
Chiara Lubich at a Focolare gathering

=== New Families Movement ===
On 19 July 1967, Chiara announced the beginning of a movement for families. She asked couples who were living the spirituality of unity to reach out to all couples, but especially to focus on those who most reflected the suffering of Jesus abandoned on the cross. Groups formed all over the world, and hundreds of social projects to support family life, providing concrete help for those in need and sponsoring children with their "Adoptions-at-a-Distance" project, and international adoptions.

=== Towards the Church as communion ===
Ever since the early years of the movement in Trento, Chiara had frequent contacts with men and women religious of various congregations as well as diocesan priests. She encouraged them to implement in their communities and parishes the last desire of Jesus, "Father, that they may all be one". This led to a widespread movement among religious and priests at large, while branches developed for those who wanted to commit to living the spirituality according to their vocation and their founder's spirit.

=== "Operation Africa" ===
In 1964, during the Second Vatican Council, Bishop Julius Peeters from Cameroon asked Chiara about the possibility of sending medical help to a region of his country where the people were at risk of disease. She requested some of the Focolare members who were doctors or nurses to go to the village of Fontem. They discovered that vaccinating the population helped immensely to improve their situation. Seeing their great need, Chiara launched "Operation Africa" among the youth of the movement, who raised money to build a hospital and then schools for the village. She went in person to visit the Bangwa people in Fontem in 1966, 1969 and 2000. Fontem is the site of Mary Health of Africa mission hospital. a 120-bed hospital that also has an extensive outpatient service and runs a dispensary in nearby Fonjumetaw.

=== Eastern Europe ===
Starting in 1955, with the encouragement of Pope Pius XII and the German bishops, some men and women members of the Focolare moved to Czecho-Slovakia and then into East Germany and other neighboring countries. Chiara gave them precise directions – be perfect workers; live mutual love and love each neighbor without speaking about it; respect the laws of the country. She traveled to Berlin nine times, both before and after the wall had been constructed. In 1990, when travel outside their countries was permitted, several hundred youths from eastern Europe were able to participate in the GenFest in Rome. In August 1991, in Katowice, Poland, 6,500 members of the Focolare Movement, coming from Eastern European countries belonging to the communist bloc, met for the first time with Chiara and with one another.

=== For an economy of communion ===
In May 1991, Chiara arrived in São Paulo, Brazil, to meet with the members of the movement there. The idea emerged for a project called the "Economy of communion" (EOC) in which businesses would, first of all, live the spirit of unity among their employees, competitors, and customers, and then share part of their profits to raise people out of poverty and form a "culture of giving" rather than of "having". It stimulated the interest of academics who have studied the praxis being used and are presenting a new economic theory in universities worldwide. Chiara was awarded several honorary doctorates in economics and, in 1999, presented the Economy of Communion at the 50th anniversary of the Council of Europe in Strasbourg, France. In October 1998, Fernando Cardoso, president of the Federal Republic of Brazil presented Chiara with the highest award of his country, the “National Order of the Southern Cross," î"recognizing the EOC as an innovative and effective weapon in the struggle against poverty and exclusion"

=== Politics for unity ===
Chiara was invited to speak to a meeting of Italian politicians of various parties. It was 2 May 1996, in Naples. Her proposal to them was that, first of all, they should live fraternity among themselves and then bring this spirit to all their relationships with other politicians of different parties, with the goal that together they might achieve the common good. This gave shape to the Movement of Politics and Policy for Unity (MppU). Chiara outlined its fundamental features on several occasions when she met members of the government in Slovenia, Spain, France, the Czech Republic, Brazil (1998) and Italy (2000).

During her visit to Ireland in 2004, she met President Mary McAleese. Visiting the focolare center near Dublin in 2008, McAleese spoke of Lubich's "simple and beautiful idea of love as a lived reality leading to unity. Ideas such as hers," she added, "provide an antidote to the negative ideas that spread so easily, causing damage, breaking hearts and lives". That same year (2004) Chiara visited England and spoke in the House of Commons in Westminster on the topic "Liberty and equality ... What happened to fraternity". She also addressed a symposium at the United Nations in New York, sponsored by the Permanent Observer Mission of the Holy See in conjunction with the World Conference of Religions for Peace (WCRP), with the title A Unity of Nations and a Unity of Peoples. In November 2001, she was invited to a major conference held in Vienna, Austria, entitled "1,000 cities for Europe", where she proposed "the spirit of universal brotherhood in politics as a key to the unity of Europe and the world". On 12 September 2004, she gave what was to be her last public address, in Rome, on the occasion of the second international Interdependence Day.

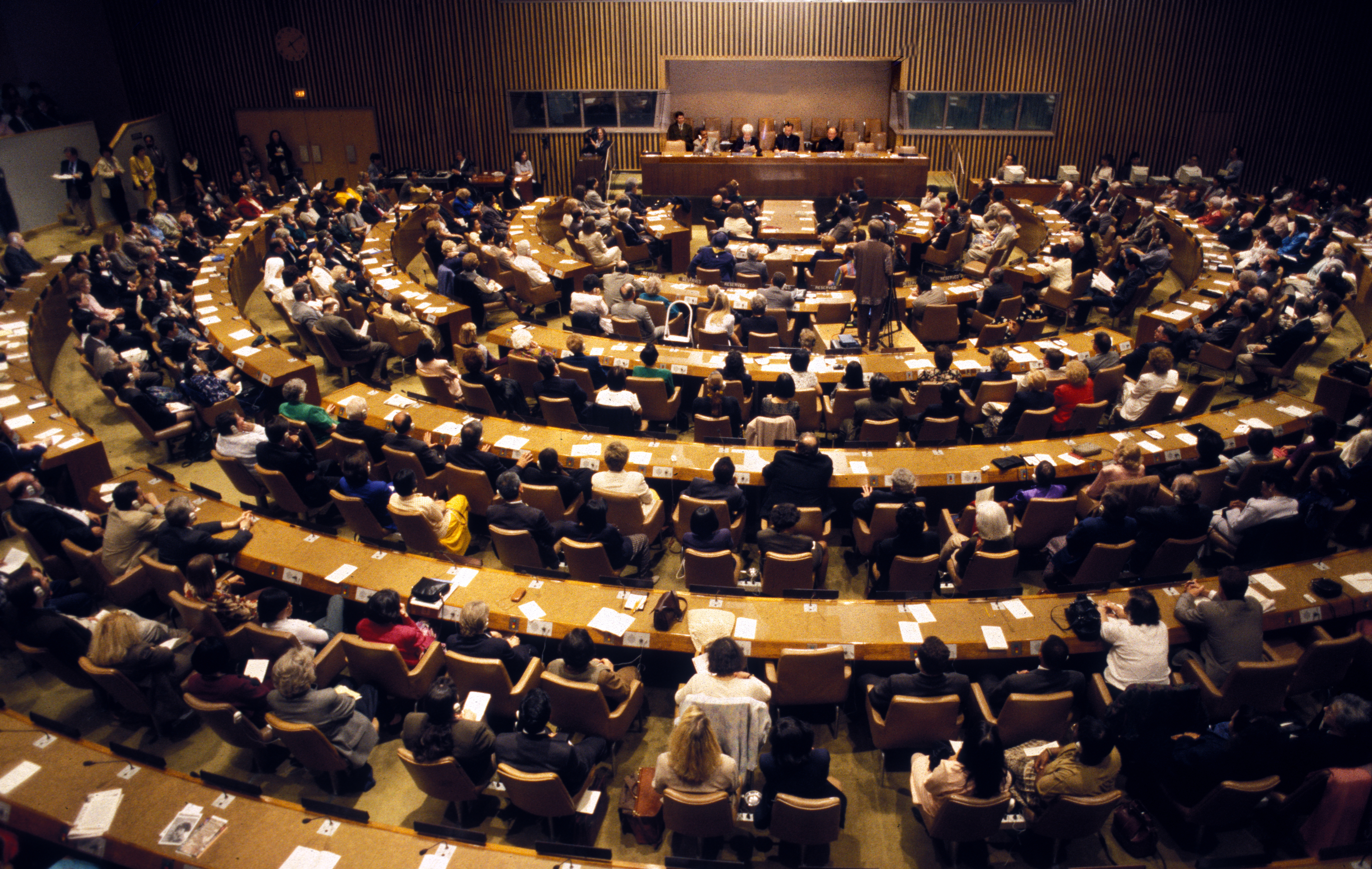
Chiara Lubich addressing the United Nations

=== An interdisciplinary culture ===
At the beginning of the 1990s, at the urging of Bishop Klaus Hemmerle, Bishop of Aachen in Germany, Chiara gathered together scholars in a variety of disciplines who had been living the Focolare spirituality for some years. They formed what is called the Abba' School, an interdisciplinary study center, to draw out a doctrine from the illuminations received during the summer of 1949. In December 2007, the pontifically approved Sophia University Institute was established in the Movement's small town of Loppiano, near Florence, offering interdisciplinary graduate programs based on the culture of unity.

== "A Woman of Dialogue" ==
Throughout her life, Chiara became a protagonist and often a forerunner of a 360-degree dialogue among civil and religious leaders, movements and individuals within the Catholic Church, with Christians of different Churches, with followers of other religions and also with people without a religious affiliation. A "dialogue of life" helps people to meet and, even though they have different ideas, to speak with a sincere love for the other person, to find some point of agreement that can clarify misunderstandings, calm disputes, resolve conflicts, and even at times eliminate hatred.

Chiara had many practical ideas about how to develop a fruitful dialogue. She explained:

We have to love the other person, but not with words or feelings. We have to be concrete in our love and the best way to do this is to 'make ourselves one’ with them, 'live the life of the other’ in a certain way, sharing their sufferings and their joys, understanding them, serving and helping them in practical ways. ‘Making ourselves one’ is the attitude that guided the apostle Paul, who wrote that he made himself a Jew with the Jews, Greek with the Greeks, all things to all people (cf. 1Cor 9:19–22). We must follow his example so that we can establish a sincere, friendly dialogue with everyone.

This attitude suggested by Chiara also eliminates any idea of winning the other person over to one's religion or point of view. Instead, it leads people who were strangers to discover that they are all brothers and sisters in the one human family. Pope John Paul II defined the members of the Focolare Movement as “apostles of dialogue”

=== Reconciliation among Christians ===
As everything in Chiara's experience, the ecumenical stage of the Movement began with a personal contact. In 1961, a group of Lutheran nuns invited her to Darmstadt in Germany to share with them the principles of her spirituality. Some Lutheran pastors were also present and were so struck by her radical evangelical lifestyle that they expressed the desire to spread this spirituality among Lutherans. In 2008, in his tribute to Chiara, the General Secretary of the World Lutheran Federation (LWF), Rev. Dr. Ishmael Noko, said: "Many in the Lutheran communion have drawn inspiration from this laywoman".” In 1966, in London, Chiara had an audience with the Archbishop of Canterbury, Michael Ramsey, Primate of the Anglican Communion, and subsequently with his successors. The former Archdeacon of Canterbury, Bernard Pawley, once described the Focolare as having "burst forth in the Church like a fountain of living water from the Gospel".

From 1967 to 1972, she traveled to Istanbul eight times, where she engaged in a deep fraternal dialogue with the Ecumenical Patriarch of Constantinople, Athenagoras I, with whom she had 24 audiences over the years. This dialogue continued with his successors, Demetrios I and Bartholomew I. Chiara also formed a deep and lasting friendship with Frère Roger Schutz, founder of the ecumenical community of Taizé.

Since 1967, she had contacts with the Ecumenical Council of Churches based in Geneva, Switzerland. Samuel Kobia, General Secretary of WCC in 2008, wrote in testimony of Chiara's life: "Chiara Lubich had a profound impact on the ecumenical movement and helped significantly to foster viable relationships between churches of different Christian traditions. (…) Our love for Chiara and immense gratitude for the gift of God she has been to the ecumenical movement will continue to motivate and inspire us in our work for the visible unity of the Church".

In all of these contacts, Chiara referred her activities to the Pontifical Council for Promoting Christian Unity, where she received full support. She also felt confirmed in this work by all the modern Popes, beginning with Pope John XXIII who had placed Christian unity as one of the first goals for the Second Vatican Council.

=== Communion with Catholic ecclesial movements and new communities ===
On the eve of Pentecost 1998, in St. Peter's Square in Rome, Pope John Paul II held the first large meeting of ecclesial movements and new communities, with the presence of 250,000 people from many nations of the world. In his address, he said: "The institutional and charismatic aspects are co-essential in the Church’s constitution. They contribute, although differently, to the life, renewal, and sanctification of God’s People. It is from this providential rediscovery of the Church’s charismatic dimension that, before and after the Council, a remarkable pattern of growth has been established for ecclesial movements and new communities". And he added: "The Church expects from you mature fruits of communion and commitment." Chiara addressed the Pope with three other founders, Fr. Luigi Giussani (Communion and Liberation), Jean Vanier (L’Arche) and Kiko Argüello (Neocatechumenal Way) and she assured him that she would work for the unity among the movements." From then on, she dedicated herself with a particular passion to increasing the communion among the founders, directors, and members of movements and new communities.

=== "Together for Europe" ===
The experience of Catholic movements coming together inspired members of other Christian movements who asked to join them. Since 1999, a network of collaboration among Catholic and Lutheran movements and communities was formed and gradually spread to many other groups and movements in Christian Churches throughout Europe. The result has been an ongoing project of working together called "Together for Europe". It is ecumenical, but also includes political leaders, and the goal is to contribute toward giving "a new soul to the old continent", considering the difficult process of integrating eastern and western Europe. The first major event took place in Stuttgart in 2004 with Chiara as one of the main speakers. 9,000 people participated while 163 similar events were held simultaneously in other locations.

=== Dialogue with members of other religions ===
The door to interreligious dialogue opened, quite unexpectedly, in London, 1977, when Chiara received the Templeton Prize for Progress in Religion (also known as the Templeton Prize). In her acceptance speech, she outlined her Christian experience and mentioned that the Focolare Movement also had contacts with Jews, Muslims, Hindus and Buddhists, since friendships had developed in countries where these religious groups are present. She also quoted some of the great mystics of other religions who exalt love as the essence of all being. The response from religious leaders present was beyond anything she would have expected and for her was a sign that the Movement had to develop its interreligious dialogue.

In 1981, Chiara was invited to Tokyo by Nikkyo Niwano, the founder of Risshō KōseiKai, a lay Buddhist movement, to offer her spiritual experience to 10,000 Buddhists gathered in a prestigious Buddhist temple. It was the first time a Christian woman had spoken there. The impact was great and many of those present said that it helped them to appreciate the basic tenets of Christianity.

In January 1997, she went to Chiang Mai in Thailand, where she had been asked to address 800 Buddhist monks and nuns. Again, she was the first Christian and the first laywoman to address them. Their Great Teacher, Ajahn Thong, explained, "The wise person is neither male nor female. When someone turns on a light in the darkness, one does not ask if the one who lit it was a man or a woman. Chiara is here to give us the light she has experienced".

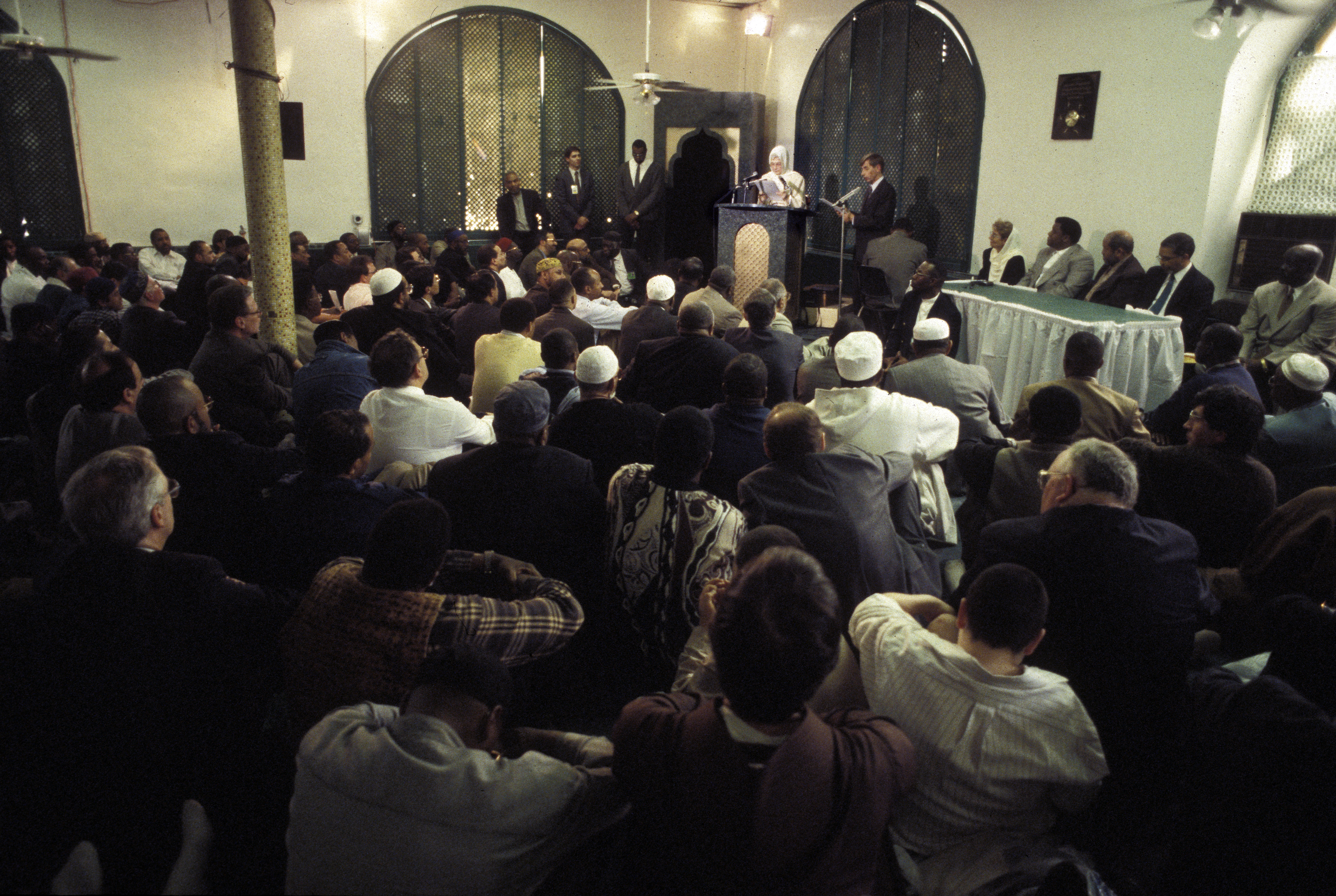
Chiara Lubich addressing the Malcolm Shabazz Mosque in Harlem, New York

In May of that same year, she was invited to the Malcolm Shabazz Mosque in New York, where once again she simply shared her Christian experience with 3,000 Muslims, referencing quotes from Islam that were similar to the Gospel, to which the crowd responded, "God is great!" At the end of the meeting, she made a pact of fraternity with their leader, Imam Warith Deen Mohammed.

Three years later, they met again in Washington DC, with 6000 Christians and Muslims to celebrate an event called "Faith Communities Together". Since then, this initiative has been repeated throughout the United States in many cities, bringing together the two communities for fellowship and common concrete projects.

In Buenos Aires, in April 1998, Chiara met members of the Jewish community of Argentina and Uruguay at the invitation of the B'nai B'rith and other Jewish organizations.

In 2001, she took her first trip to India invited by Kala Acharya, director of the Bharatiya Sanskriti Peetham University in Mumbai, who said, "It is time to break down the walls of separation and discover the garden of the other". Two prestigious Hindu-Gandhian institutions in Tamil Nadu conferred on her the Defender of Peace Award. She returned in 2003 on the invitation of the leader of a vast Hindu movement, the Swadhyaya Movement.

In 2002, among the official testimonies for peace offered by the representatives of the various churches and religions at the Day of Prayer for Peace in Assisi, presided over by Pope John Paul II, Chiara and Andrea Riccardi, founder of the Saint Egidio Community, gave the address on behalf of the Catholic Church. In 2004, at Westminster Central Hall in London, Chiara, speaking to a large audience of people of various religions and cultures, proposed a strategy of fraternal love that could mark a turning point for international relations, "because fraternity is God’s plan for the whole human family".

=== Dialogue with persons with no religious affiliation ===
In 1978, Chiara inaugurated the Focolare center for dialogue with persons who profess no particular faith, but who follow their conscience and are committed to living and spreading the great common values of humanity. Groups were formed of persons with religious faith and those of other convictions, but who all share the same desire to work for universal brotherhood in the world and to recompose the unity of the human family. On the occasion of their first congress in 1992, Chiara told them: “You are an essential part of the Focolare Movement because the values of solidarity and justice that you promote contribute to the project of unity which is the goal of this Movement."

=== Dialogue with contemporary culture ===
Chiara soon realized that the spirituality of unity has something to offer to every profession and area of engagement in society. People began to meet with others in their field of work so that groups formed to increase unity and fraternal love within their profession or area of work. They promote scholarly research to bring the values of love of neighbor and unity to bear on the normal practice of medicine, education, art, sports, ecology, psychology, economics, politics, etc. and also sponsor conferences, training courses and various publications on these topics.

== Final years ==
=== The "night of God" and the "night of our age" ===
For Chiara, as for Mother Teresa of Calcutta and other persons of great spiritual depth, a biography cannot keep silent about a “hidden” side of their life, a mysterious aspect, but of considerable importance. Since the time of Saint John of the Cross, these have been called "nights" of the soul in the language of mysticism. Chiara said that her life was marked by "luminous peaks of love and the dark depths of pain". A climax came for her when she experienced the "night of God", the last serious trial at the end of her life, from 2004 to 2008. It seemed to her that "God had disappeared, like the sun disappearing over the horizon and no longer seen".” It was a personal "night", but she also saw it projected onto the "night of our age". Once again, Chiara found the way out of this trial by embracing Jesus on the cross, who in the "darkest possible night" felt abandoned by his Father. She pointed out "signs of the resurrection" in many aspects of her work, particularly in the fields of politics, economics, communication, interreligious and cultural dialogue. She felt that these "resurrections" came from the faithful love for Jesus forsaken amid pain and darkness. This was her last public message, concluding with:

If we walk forward in these ways we can say: ‘My night has no darkness’, but all things shine in the light.

=== The last greeting ===
After a long period (from September 2004) in which her health failed, at the beginning of February 2008, Chiara was admitted to the Agostino Gemelli University Hospital in Rome. During her stay, she received a visit from the Ecumenical Patriarch of Constantinople, Bartholomew I, and a letter from Pope Benedict XVI. On 13 March 2008, since nothing more could be done for her medically, she was discharged and returned to her home in Rocca di Papa, where she peacefully died the next day, 14 March, at the age of 88.

Her funeral was celebrated in Rome, on 18 March, at the Basilica of Saint Paul Outside the Walls. Thousands of people packed the church and overflowed outside where large screens had been set up to allow them to follow the service. Civic leaders as well as prominent figures from the Catholic Church, many other Christian churches and other religions, attended and offered their testimony to her life. An eminent Thai Buddhist monk, Phara-Maha Thongratana, commented: "Now Chiara and her great Ideal are the legacies of the whole of humanity". News of her funeral was reported internationally. Cardinal Tarcisio Bertone, then-Secretary of State of the Vatican, read the letter from Pope Benedict XVI, who said among other things:

The continuous link with my venerable predecessors, from the Servant of God, Pius XII, to Blessed John XXIII and the Servants of God, Paul VI, John Paul I and John Paul II, was concrete testimony that the thought of the Pope was for her a sure guide. Moreover, looking at the initiatives she accomplished, one could even affirm that she had an almost prophetic capacity to perceive and anticipate it.”

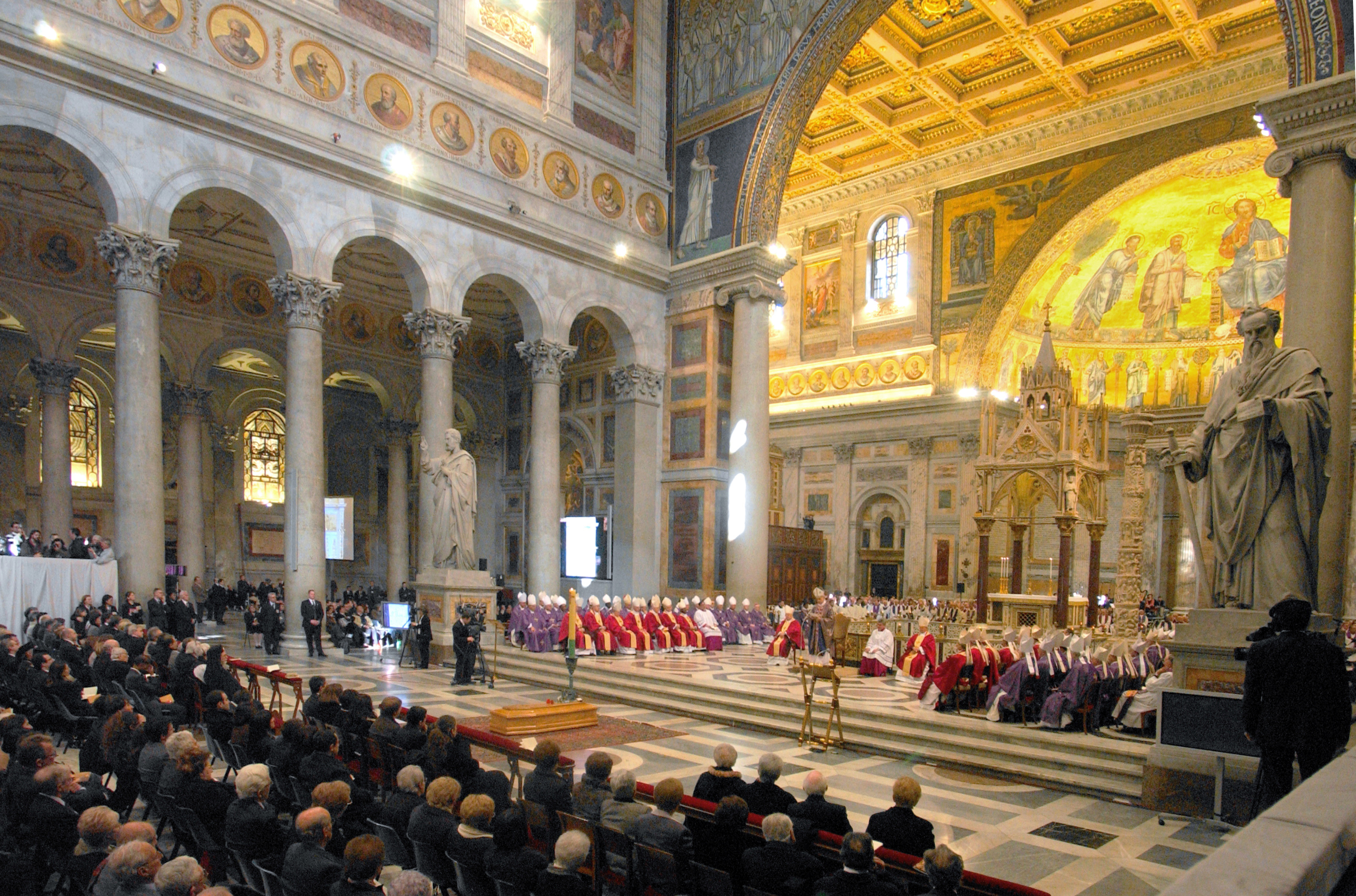
Chiara Lubich's funeral

On 27 January 2015, the cause for her beatification and canonization was opened with a message from Pope Francis which highlights its motivation "to make known to the people of God the life and works of one who, by accepting the invitation of the Lord, has turned on a new light for the path to unity in the Church". 10 November 2019, marked the end of the diocesan phase, with the cause being transferred to the Congregation of the Cause of Saints at the Vatican.

== Acknowledgements ==
=== From civil institutions and heads of state ===
- UNESCO:1996 Prize for Peace Education, December 1996
- Council of Europe:1998 Human Rights Prize, September 1998
- Brazil: National Order of the Southern Cross, the Federal Republic of Brazil, presented by the President of the Republic, Fernando Henrique Cardoso, October 1998
- Germany: Grand Merit Cross from the Federal Republic of Germany, presented by the President of the Republic, Johannes Rau, June 2000
- Taiwan: Order of the Brilliant Star of the Republic of China, February 2001
- Italy: Knight of the Great Cross Order of Merit of the Italian Republic, presented by the President of the Republic, Carlo Azeglio Ciampi, March 2004

=== Honorary citizenships ===
- Italy: Rocca di Papa, 1995; Pompei, 1996; Rimini, 1997; Palermo, 1998; Rome, 2000; Florence, 2000; Incisa Valdarno, 2000; Rovigo, 2000; Genoa, 2001; Turin, 2002; Milan, 2004; La Spezia, 2006
- Brazil: Vargem G. Paulista, 1998; Manues Amazonia, 1998; Paragominas Parà, 1998; Bela Vista do Toldosc, 1998; Amanindena Parà, 2002
- Argentina: Buenos Aires, 1998; Chacabuco, 1998; Santiago de Estero, 1998
- Philippines: Tagaytay, 1997
- Hungary: Janoshalma, 2008

==== Significant awards ====
- Italy: Siena, Silver Cateriniana Plaque from St. Catherine Center, September 1987
- Italy: Florence, Casentino Literary Award from the Michelangelo Cultural Center, July 1987
- Italy: Trento, Burning Eagle of St. Wenceslaus, January 1995; Gold Medal of St. Virgilius, 1995
- Italy: Milan, Author of the Year Award from the Union of Italian Catholic Publishers and Booksellers, March 1995
- Italy: Bologna, Silver Turret Award, September 1997
- Argentina: Illustrious Visitor, Government of the City of Buenos Aires, April 1998
- Brazil:Coat of Arms of the city of Belém, December 1998
- Slovenia: Medal of Saints Cyril and Methodius, April 1999
- Republic of Cameroon: Conferral of title, MafuaNdem (Queen sent by God) by the Fon of Fontem, king of theBangwa, Lucas Njifua, Fontem, May 2000
- Italy: Liguria Region, Award for peace and solidarity, December 2001
- Italy: Lombardy Region, Rosa Camuna Award, November 2003
- Italy: Brescia, Paul VI Goodness Award, 2005
- USA: Lifetime Achievement Award, Family Theater Productions, Hollywood, July 2006

=== For interreligious dialogue ===
- England: Templeton Prize for Progress in Religion, from the Templeton Foundation, London, April 1977
- Italy:“An olive tree for peace,”Jewish Community of Rome, planted in Rocca di Papa, October 1995
- Italy: Civilization of Love award for interreligious dialogue, from the International Civilization of Love Forum, Rieti, June 1996
- Brazil: Plaque for Promoting Interreligious Dialogue and a Culture of Peace, Respect and Fraternity, from the Christian-Jewish Fraternal Council, Sao Paulo, April 1998
- USA: Plaque for Love of Neighbor and Solidarity with Muslim communities of Imam W.D. Mohammed, Malcolm Shabazz Mosque in Harlem, New York, May 1999
- India: Defender of Peace Award, Gandhian-Hindu movements, Shanti Ashram and Sarvodaya, Coimbatore, January 2001
- India: Citation in honor of Chiara Lubich, SomayiaBharatiyaSanskritiPeethamUniversity, Mumbai, January 2001
- USA: Crystal of recognition for excellent service to humanity in the field of religion, the Muslim community, Chicago, May 2004

=== For ecumenical dialogue ===
==== The Anglican Communion ====
- Cross of the Order of St. Augustine of Canterbury from the Primate of the Anglican Church, Archbishop Robert Runcie, London, 1981;
- Golden Cross of the Order of St. Augustine of Canterbury from the Primate of the Anglican Church, Archbishop George Carey, London, 1996.

==== Greek Orthodox Church ====
Byzantine Cross, from the Ecumenical Patriarchs of Constantinople, Dimitrios I, in Istanbul, 1984, and Bartholomew I in Istanbul, 1995.

==== Evangelical Lutheran Churches ====
- Augsburg Peace Prize, “for special achievement ininterconfessional agreements,” at a common celebration of Lutherans and Catholics, Augsburg, Germany, October 1988

=== From academic institutions ===
==== Honorary Doctorates Honoris Causa ====
- Poland: Social Sciences, Catholic University of Lublin, 19 June 1996
- Thailand: Social Communications, St. John University, Bangkok, 5 January 1997
- Philippines: Theology, Pontifical and Royal University of Santo Tomas, Manila, 14 January 1997
- Taiwan: Theology, Fu Jen Catholic University, Taipei, January 1997
- USA:Humane Letters, Sacred Heart University, Fairfield, Connecticut, promoted by Rabbi Jack Bemporad, director of the Center for Christian-Jewish Understanding at this university, 21 May 1997
- Mexico: Philosophy, La Salle University, Mexico City, 6 June 1997
- Argentina: Dialogue with Contemporary Culture, State University of Buenos Aires, 6 April 1998
- Brazil: Humanities and Religious Sciences, Pontifical Catholic University of São Paulo, 29 April 1998; Economics, Catholic University of Pernambuco, 9 May 1998
- Italy:Business and Economics, Catholic University of the Sacred Heart, Milan, conferred at the Piacenza Campus, 29 January 1999
- Malta: Psychology, University of Malta, 26 February 1999
- USA:Education, Catholic University of America, Washington, November 2000
- Slovakia: Theology, University of Trnava, 23 June 2003
- Italy: Theology of Consecrated Life, the Claretian Institute of the Theology of the Consecrated Life, a Pontifical Lateran University, Rome, 25 October 2004
- Venezuela: Art, Cecilio Acosta Catholic University, Maracaibo,18 November 2006
- England:Divinity, Liverpool Hope University, delivered by the rector at Lubich's home in Rocca di Papa, 5 January 2008

==== From cultural institutions ====
- Italy: Prize for Dialogue among Peoples, International Franciscan Study Center, Massa Carrara, October 1993
- Brazil: Medal of Honor, State University of São Paulo (USP), April 1998
- Argentina: Medal of Honor, Pontifical Catholic University of Argentina, Buenos Aires, April 1998
- Italy: The Trento Person of the Year Award from the Person-City-Territory Cultural Association, Trento, June 2001
- Italy: Stefano Borgia Award for intercultural and interreligious dialogue from the International Centre for Borgian Studies, Velletri, November 2001
- Italy: Honorary member of the Luigi Getta Study Centre, Rome, March 2003
- Venezuela: Establishment of the “Chiara Lubich”Free Chair of Studies, Cecilio Acosta Catholic University, Maracaibo, February 2005
- Paraguay: Thomas More Award, Our Lady of the Assumption Catholic University, Asunción, 27 December 2006
- Brazil: Medal of Honor, State University of Sao Paulo, April 1998; “Chiara Lubich” Chair in Fraternity and Humanism, Recife Catholic University, 25 March 2014

==== International honors ====
- Argentina: Illustrious Visitor, Government of the City of Buenos Aires, April 1998
- Brazil:Coat of Arms of the city of Belém, December 1998
- Italy: Telamon International Peace Award, Social Programming Center, Agrigento, July 1999
- Republic of Cameroon: Conferral of title, MafuaNdem (Queen sent by God) by the Fon of Fontem, king of theBangwa, Lucas Njifua, Fontem, May 2000
- Italy: City of Peace Award, Castelgandolfo, April 2003
- Italy: CivisTusculanus Award, Frascati, September 2004
- Switzerland: Bourgeoisie of honor presented by the Mayor of Mollens, August 2007

== Publications ==
Declared the author of the year 1995 with the UELCI Prize, Chiara Lubich authored 58 books (including bestsellers such as Meditations), translated into 28 languages, with 30 editions, and over 3,200,000 copies. In March 2018, the first volume (Words of Life) was published, a series aimed at presenting systematically the heritage of her thought. Coeditors are Città Nuova Editrice and the Chiara Lubich Center, which was founded in 2008 to preserve her rich patrimony of thought and make it available in various formats to a wider public [88]. A selection:

=== Cornerstones of the spirituality of unity ===
- The Gen Revolution, New City Press, New York, 1972
- A Little Harmless Manifesto, New City Press, New York, 1973;Manifesto, New City, London, 1975
- Meditations, New City Press, New York, 1988; New City, London, 2005 (4th edition)
- Yes Yes No No, New City, London, 1977
- Charity our Ideal, New City Press, New York, 1977; Charity, New City, London, 1981
- Where Two or Three, New City Press, New York, 1977; New City, London, 1977
- Servants of All, New City Press, New York, 1978; New City, London, 1979
- The Eucharist, New City Press, New York, 1978; New City, London, 1979
- Knowing How to Lose, New City, London, 1981
- Our Yes to God, New City Press, New York, 1982; New City, London, 1982
- When Did We See You, Lord?, New City Press, New York, 1983; Jesus in our Brother, New City, London, 1983
- Journey: Spiritual Insights, New City Press, New York, 1984
- Jesus: The Heart of His Message: Unity and Jesus Forsaken, New City Press, New York, 1985; Why Have You Forsaken Me?, New City, London, 1985
- Diary 1964–65, New City Press, New York, 1987
- On the Holy Journey: Spiritual Messages, New City Press, New York, 1988
- A Call to Love.Spiritual Writings, Volume 1, New City Press, New York, 1990
- When Our Love is Charity. Spiritual writings, Volume 2, New City Press, New York, 1991
- The Love that Comes from God. Reflections on the Family, New City Press, New York, 1993
- The Living Presence – Jesus in the Word, in the Eucharist and in our midst, New City Press, New York, 1997; New City, London, 1997
- Heaven on Earth, Meditations and Reflections, New City Press, New York, 2000
- The Cry of Jesus Crucified and Forsaken, New City Press, New York, 2001; New City, London, 2001
- A New Way: The spirituality of unity, New City Press, New York, 2002; New City, London, 2006
- Mary, Transparency of God, New City Press, New York, 2003;New City, London, 2003
- Essential Writings – Spirituality Dialogue Culture, New City Press, New York, 2007; New City, London, 2007

=== Posthumous publications ===
- Early Letters: At the origins of a new spirituality, edited by F. Gillet and G. D'Alessandro, New City Press, New York, 2012
- God is Love, edited by F. Gillet, New City Press, New York, 2011
- Rays: Short Reflections on living God's will, edited by B. Hartnett, New City Press, New York, 2011
- God's Word to Us, edited by B. Hartnett, New City Press, New York, 2012
- Neighbors, Short Reflections on loving the people around us, edited by B. Hartnett, New City Press, New York, 2012
- The Pearl of the Gospel, Short Reflections on Mutual Love, edited by F. Gillet, New City Press, New York, 2013
- The Sun that Daily Rises, Short Reflections on the Eucharist, edited by F. Ciardi, New City Press, New York, 2014
- Unity, edited by D. Falmi, and F. Gillet, New City Press, New York, 201
- Jesus forsaken, edited by H. Blaumeiser, New City Press, New York, 2016; New City, London, 2016
- Mary, edited by B. Leahy and J. Povilus, New City Press, New York, 2018; New City, London, 2017
- The Holy Spirit, edited by R Silva and F. Gillet, New City Press, New York, 2018; New City, London, 2018
- The Church, edited by H. Blaumeiser and B. Leahy, New City Press, New York, 2019; New City, London, 2018
- Jesus in our Midst, edited by D. Falmi, and J. Povilus, New City Press, New York, 2019; New City, London, 2019

=== On various topics ===
- Chiara Lubich, Here and Now: Meditations on living in the present, New City Press, New York, 2005; New City, London, 2000, 2014
- Chiara Lubich, TheArt of Loving, New City Press, New York,2010
- Chiara Lubich, Living Dialogue: Steps on the way to unity among Christians, New City Press, New York, 2009; New City, London, 2009
- Chiara Lubich, No Thorn without a Rose:99 Sayings, New City Press, New York, 2008
- Chiara Lubich, Only at Night We See the Stars, New City Press, New York, 2002; New City, London, 2002
- Chiara Lubich, From Scriptures to Life, New City Press, New York, 1991
- Chiara Lubich, Christmas Joy: Spiritual Insights by New City Press, London, New York, Manila, 1998
- Michel Pochet, Stars and Tears: a Conversation with Chiara Lubich, New City Press, New York, 1985; New City, London, 1985
- William Proctor, An Interview with Chiara Lubich, New City Press, New York, 1983
- Armando Tono, Chiara Lubich: A Biography, New City Press, New York, 2012
- Franca Zambonini, Chiara Lubich: A Life for Unity, New City Press, New York, 2012; New City, London, 1992
- Florence Gillet, Model of Incarnate Love, Mary Desolate in the experience and thought of Chiara Lubich, New City Press, New York, 2010
- Marisa Cerini, God who is Love, in the experience and thought of Chiara Lubich, New City Press, New York, 1992
- Florence Gillet, The Choice of Jesus Forsaken, in the theological perspective of Chiara Lubich, New City Press, New York, 2015
- Judith Povilus, United in His Name, Jesus in the Midst in the experience and thought of Chiara Lubich, New City Press, New York, 1992
- Florence Gillet, Fifteen Days of Prayer with Chiara Lubich, New City Press, New York, 2009
- Luigino Bruni, ed, The Economy of Communion, Toward a Multi-dimensional Economic Culture, New City Press, New York, 2002
- M. James, T. Masters, A. Uelmen, Educations’ Highest Aim, Teaching and Learning through a Spirituality of Communion, New City Press, New York, 2010
- T. Masters, A. Uelmen, Focolare: Living the Spirituality of Unity in the United States, New City Press, New York, 2011

== See also ==
- Focolare Movement
- Igino Giordani
- Pasquale Foresi
- Economy of Communion
- List of peace activists
