= Monasterolo =

Monasterolo may refer to several places in Italy:

- Monasterolo Casotto, a municipality in the province of Cuneo, Piedmont
- Monasterolo del Castello, a municipality in the province of Bergamo, Lombardy
- Monasterolo di Savigliano, a municipality in the province of Cuneo, Piedmont
- Monasterolo Torinese, a civil parish (frazione) of Cafasse (TO), Piedmont
- Castle of Monasterolo, a castle in Monasterolo del Castello (BG), Lombardy

== See also ==
- Monastero (disambiguation)
