= Villanova Canavese =

- Comune
- Comune di Villanova Canavese
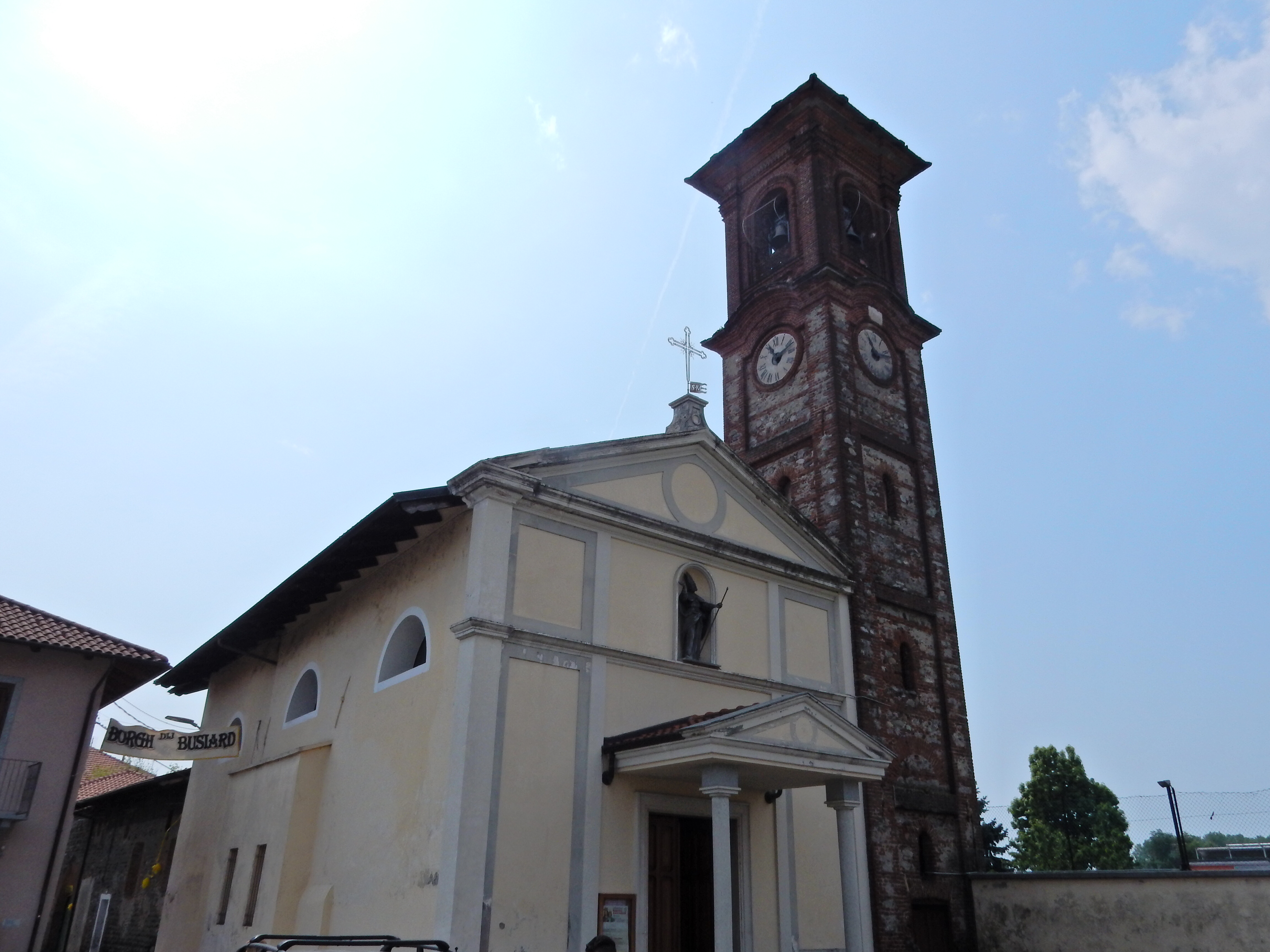

- Location within Italy Location within Piedmont
- Coordinates: 45°15′N 7°33′E
- Country: Italy
- Region: Piedmont
- Metropolitan city: Turin (TO)

Government
  - Mayor: Roberto Ferrero

Area
  - Total: 3.9 km^{2} (1.5 sq mi)
- Elevation: 380 m (1,250 ft)

Population (31 December 2010)
  - Total: 1,141
  - Density: 290/km^{2} (760/sq mi)
- Demonym: Villanovesi
- Time zone: UTC+1 (CET)
  - Summer (DST): UTC+2 (CEST)
- Postal code: 10070
- Dialing code: 011

Villanova Canavese is a comune (municipality) in the Metropolitan City of Turin in the Italian region Piedmont, located about 25 kilometres (16 mi) northwest of Turin. Villanova Canavese borders the following municipalities: Mathi, Nole, Grosso, Cafasse, and Fiano.
