= Malone (river) =

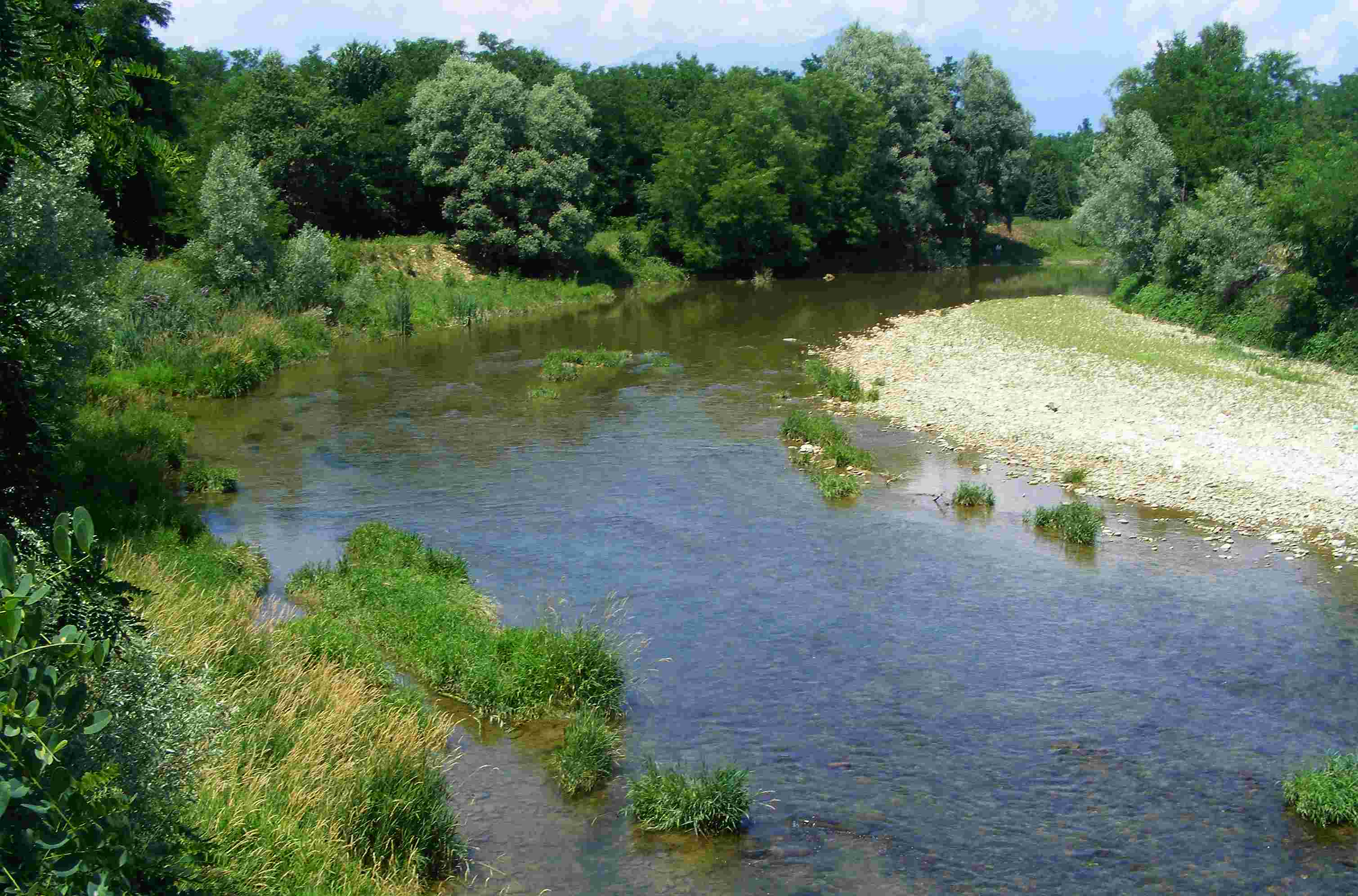
- The creek near Front

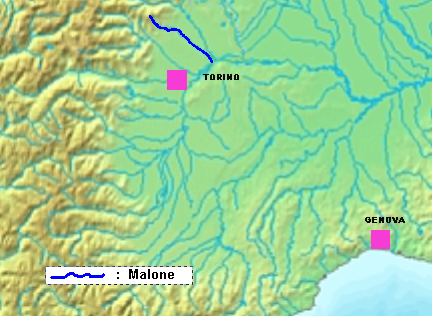

Location
- Country: Italy

Physical characteristics
- Source
  - location: Monte Soglio, Graian Alps
  - elevation: 1,971 m (6,467 ft)
- Mouth
  - location: Po at Brandizzo, near Chivasso
  - coordinates: 45.1788°N 7.8618°E
- Length: 47.7 km (29.6 mi)
- Basin size: 360.8 km^{2} (139.3 mi^{2})
- Discharge
  - average: 6.8 m^{3}/s (240 cu ft/s)

Basin features
- Progression: Po→ Adriatic Sea

Malone is a 48-kilometre (30 mi) long stream (torrente) of the Metropolitan City of Turin in Piedmont, north-western Italy. It is a left side tributary of the river Po which flows through the Canavese.

== Geography ==
The river's source is at Monte Soglio from which it falls quickly and rapidly through the communes of Corio, Rocca Canavese, Barbania and Front (TO), growing in force as it receives contributions from streams descending from the Riserva Naturale della Vauda nature reserve on its right bank. The Malone then runs past Rivarossa, Lombardore, San Benigno Canavese then arrives at Brandizzo (near Chivasso) where it enters the Po.

== Regime ==
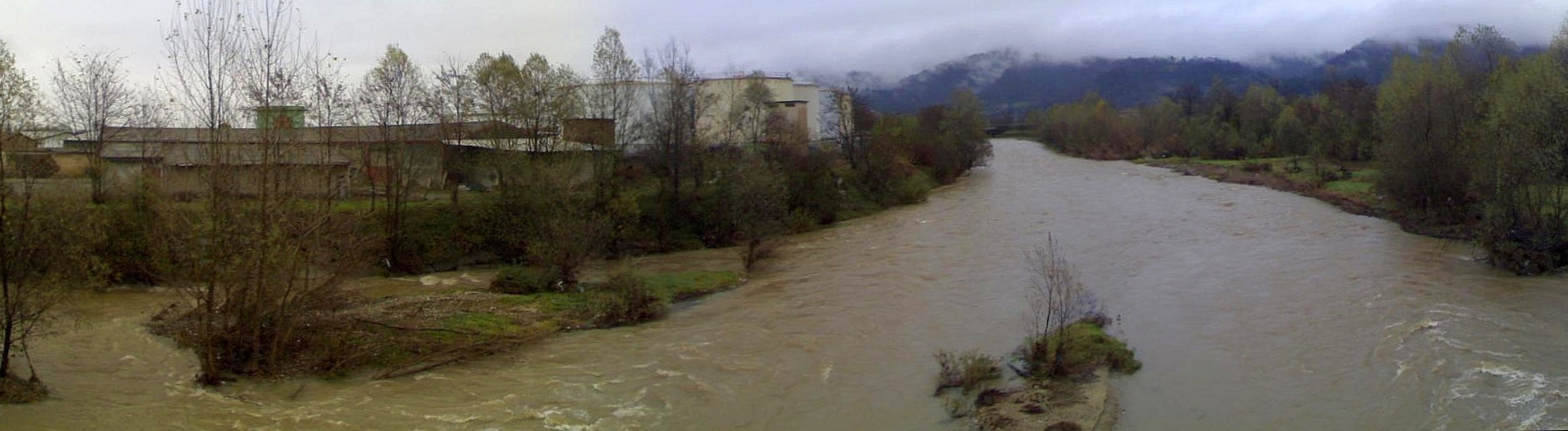
Malone creek after heavy rains in Brandizzo (autumn 2010)

The Italian word torrente, translated as torrent, or stream, refers to a river in which the flow is subject to a wide and broadly predictable seasonal variation. Torrents often dry up in summer.

The Malone in full flood, however, can be genuinely “torrential” in the normal English sense of the word. The mean discharge of around 7 cubic metres per second (250 cu ft/s) can increase a hundredfold and cause great damage, as happened in the flood of October 2000.

== Other projects ==
Media related to Malone (creek) at Wikimedia Commons
