= Mathi =

- Comune
- Comune di Mathi
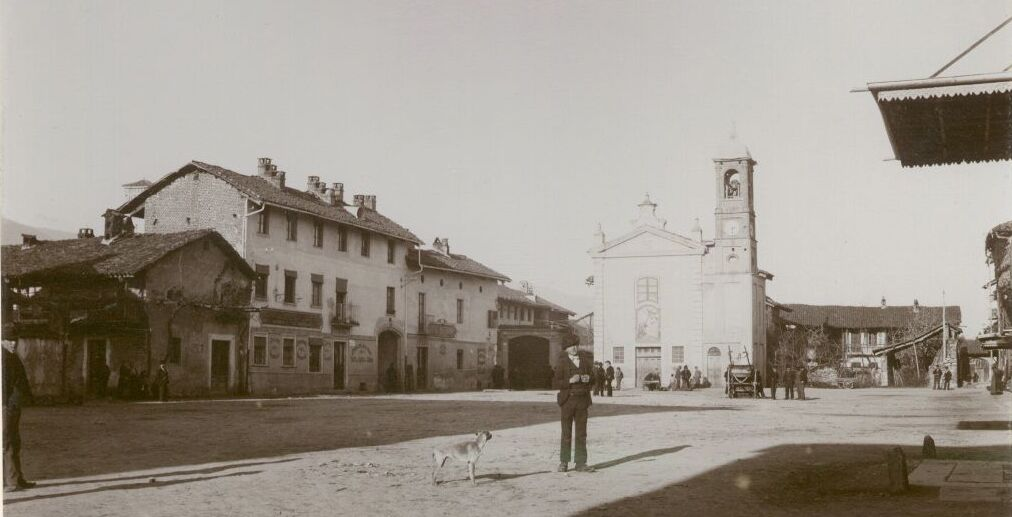

- Coat of arms

- Location within Italy Location within Piedmont
- Coordinates: 45°16′N 7°32′E
- Country: Italy
- Region: Piedmont
- Metropolitan city: Turin (TO)

Government
  - Mayor: Tommaso Turinetti

Area
  - Total: 7.1 km^{2} (2.7 sq mi)
- Elevation: 410 m (1,350 ft)

Population (31 December 2010)
  - Total: 4,074
  - Density: 570/km^{2} (1,500/sq mi)
- Demonym: Mathiesi
- Time zone: UTC+1 (CET)
  - Summer (DST): UTC+2 (CEST)
- Postal code: 10075
- Dialing code: 011
- Website: Official website

Mathi is a comune (municipality) in the Metropolitan City of Turin in the Italian region Piedmont, located about 25 kilometres (16 mi) northwest of Turin.

Mathi borders the following municipalities: Corio, Balangero, Grosso, Cafasse, and Villanova Canavese.

== Twin towns ==
- Las Parejas, Argentina
- Mġarr, Malta
