= Monastero =

Monastero is an Italian word meaning Monastery. It may refer to several Italian municipalities of Piedmont:

- Monastero Bormida, in the Province of Asti
- Monastero di Lanzo, in the Province of Turin
- Monastero di Vasco, in the Province of Cuneo
- Villa Monastero in Varenna, Italy

== See also ==
- Monasterolo (disambiguation)
