= Balangero =

- Comune
- Comune di Balangero
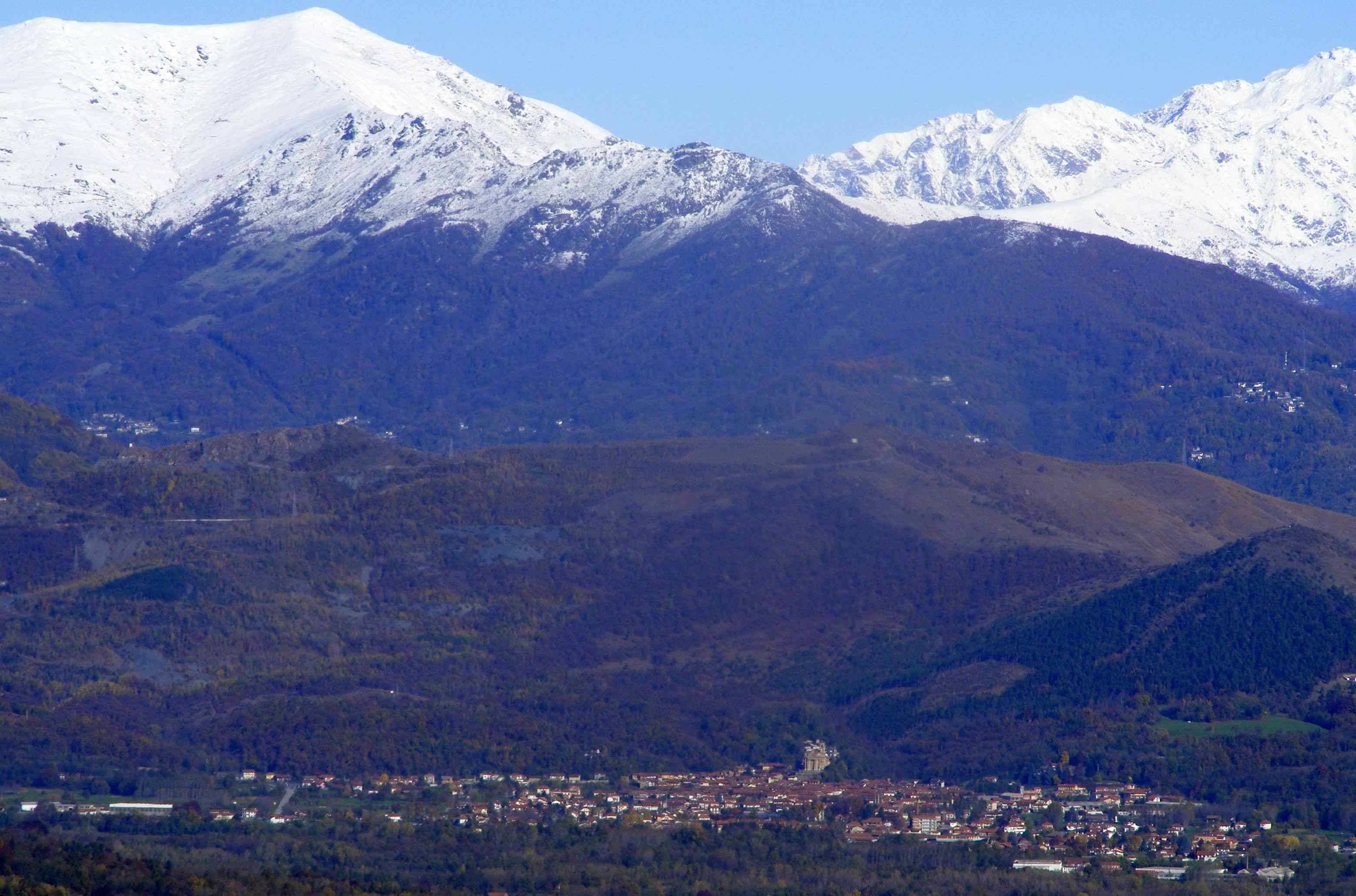

- Coat of arms

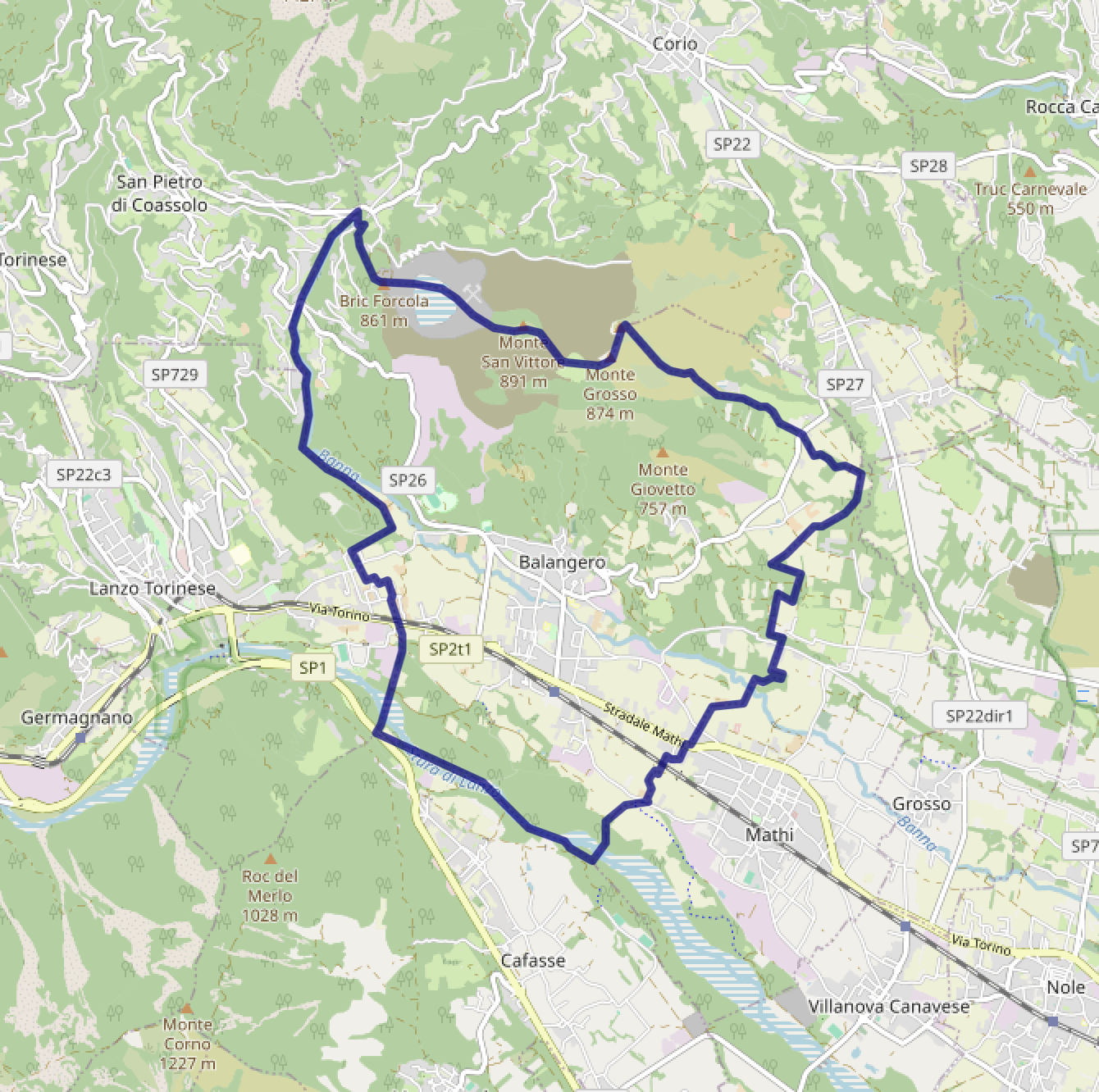
- OSM map of Balangero

- Location within Italy Location within Piedmont
- Coordinates: 45°16′N 7°31′E
- Country: Italy
- Region: Piedmont
- Metropolitan city: Turin (TO)

Government
  - Mayor: Franco Romeo

Area
  - Total: 13.01 km^{2} (5.02 sq mi)
- Elevation: 440 m (1,440 ft)

Population (30 November 2017)
  - Total: 3,174
  - Density: 244.0/km^{2} (631.9/sq mi)
- Demonym: Balangeresi
- Time zone: UTC+1 (CET)
  - Summer (DST): UTC+2 (CEST)
- Postal code: 10070
- Dialing code: 0123
- Website: Official website

Balangero is a comune (municipality) in the Metropolitan City of Turin in the Italian region Piedmont, located about 25 kilometres (16 mi) northwest of Turin.

Balangero borders the following municipalities: Corio, Coassolo Torinese, Mathi, Lanzo Torinese, and Cafasse.
