= Nole, Piedmont =

Nole
- Comune
- Comune di Nole
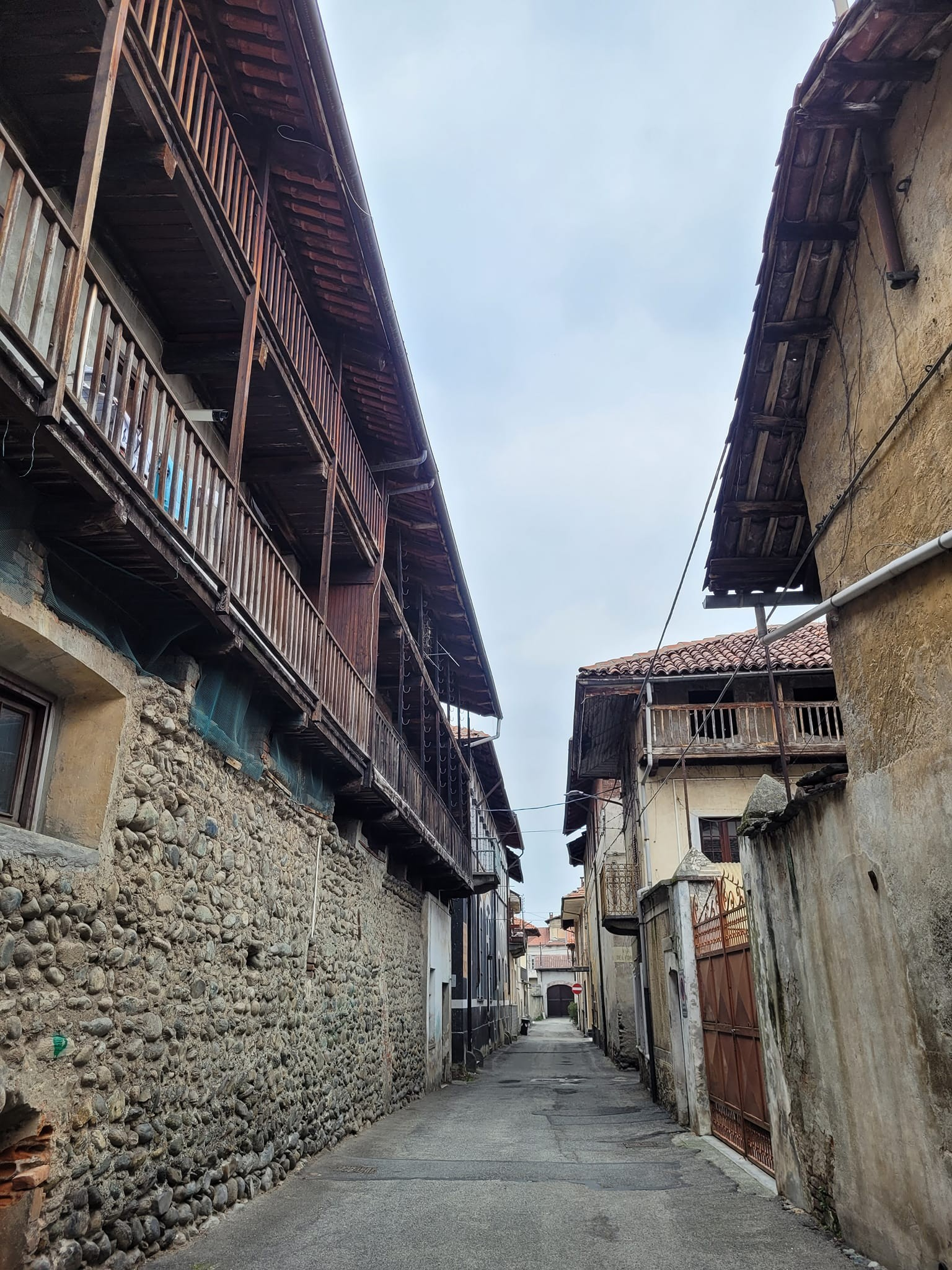

- Location within Italy Location within Piedmont
- Coordinates: 45°15′N 7°35′E
- Country: Italy
- Region: Piedmont
- Metropolitan city: Turin (TO)
- Frazioni: Grange, Vauda

Government
  - Mayor: Luca Francesco Bertino

Area
  - Total: 11.3 km^{2} (4.4 sq mi)
- Elevation: 356 m (1,168 ft)

Population (31 December 2010)
  - Total: 6,907
  - Density: 611/km^{2} (1,580/sq mi)
- Demonym: Nolesi
- Time zone: UTC+1 (CET)
  - Summer (DST): UTC+2 (CEST)
- Postal code: 10076
- Dialing code: 011
- Patron saint: St. Vincent of Saragossa
- Saint day: 22 January
- Website: Official website

Nole is a comune (municipality) in the Metropolitan City of Turin in the Italian region Piedmont, located about 25 kilometres (16 mi) northwest of Turin in the lower Canavese, at the foot of the Valli di Lanzo.

Nole borders the municipalities of Corio, Rocca Canavese, Grosso, San Carlo Canavese, Villanova Canavese, Cirié, Fiano, and Robassomero.

== Notable people ==
- Domenico Buratti (1881 – 1960), painter, poet and illustrator
- Franco Balmamion (1940), cyclist

== Twin towns ==
- Charvieu-Chavagneux, France (1987)
