= Sanctuary of Santa Cristina, Cantoira =

Church in Turin, Italy

Coordinates: 45.3267°N 7.3803°E

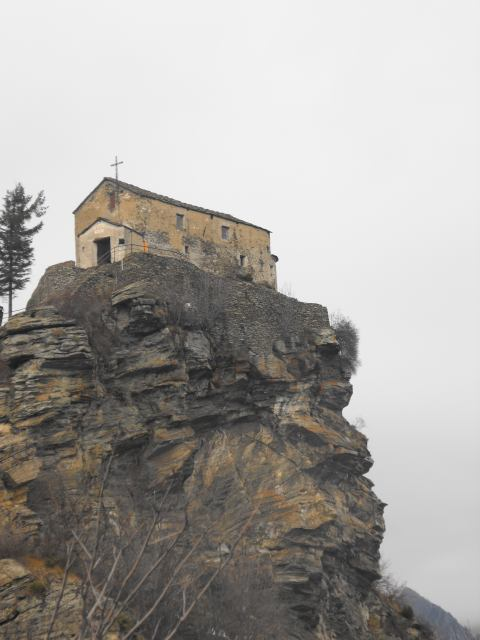
The church.

The Sanctuary of Santa Cristina is a stone chapel or small church perched precariously atop a rocky crag, some 1300 meters high, overlooking the Val Grande National Park. It is within the territory of the comune of Cantoira in the Metropolitan City of Turin, Piedmont, northern Italy. The church is only accessible via an arduous trek up hundreds of hewn stairs. A procession on foot takes place every July 24 from the town to the shrine.

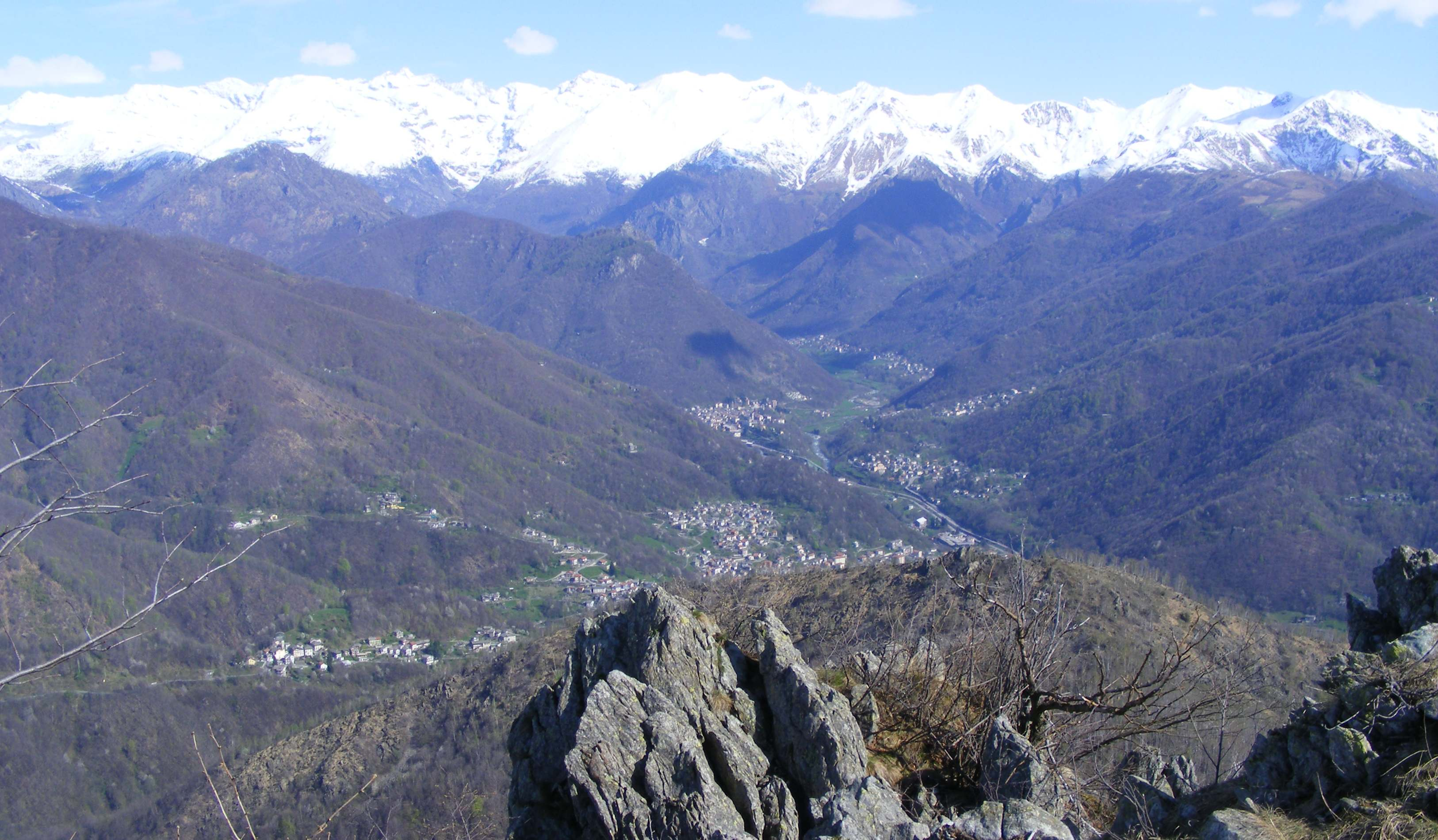
Valli di Lanzo seen from Punta Lunelle, with the Sanctuary as the grey building atop the foot hill at the center.

== Overview ==
The site had a votive pillar erected in 1440 and dedicated to Saint Christina of Bolsena. Tradition holds that a shepherd, accosted by wolves, was rescued after the apparition of the Saint dispersed the predators. The pillar is part of the choir at the right of the entrance. The mountain-top localization of the shrine has some similarities to the Sacri Monti of Piedmont and Lombardy.

The first chapel was erected by citizens of both the town of Ceres and Cantoira, and both disputed the site. The interior has some 15th-century frescoes.
