= Cantoira =

Cantoira Cantòira (Piedmontese) Centuèiri (Arpitan)
- Comune
- Comune di Cantoira
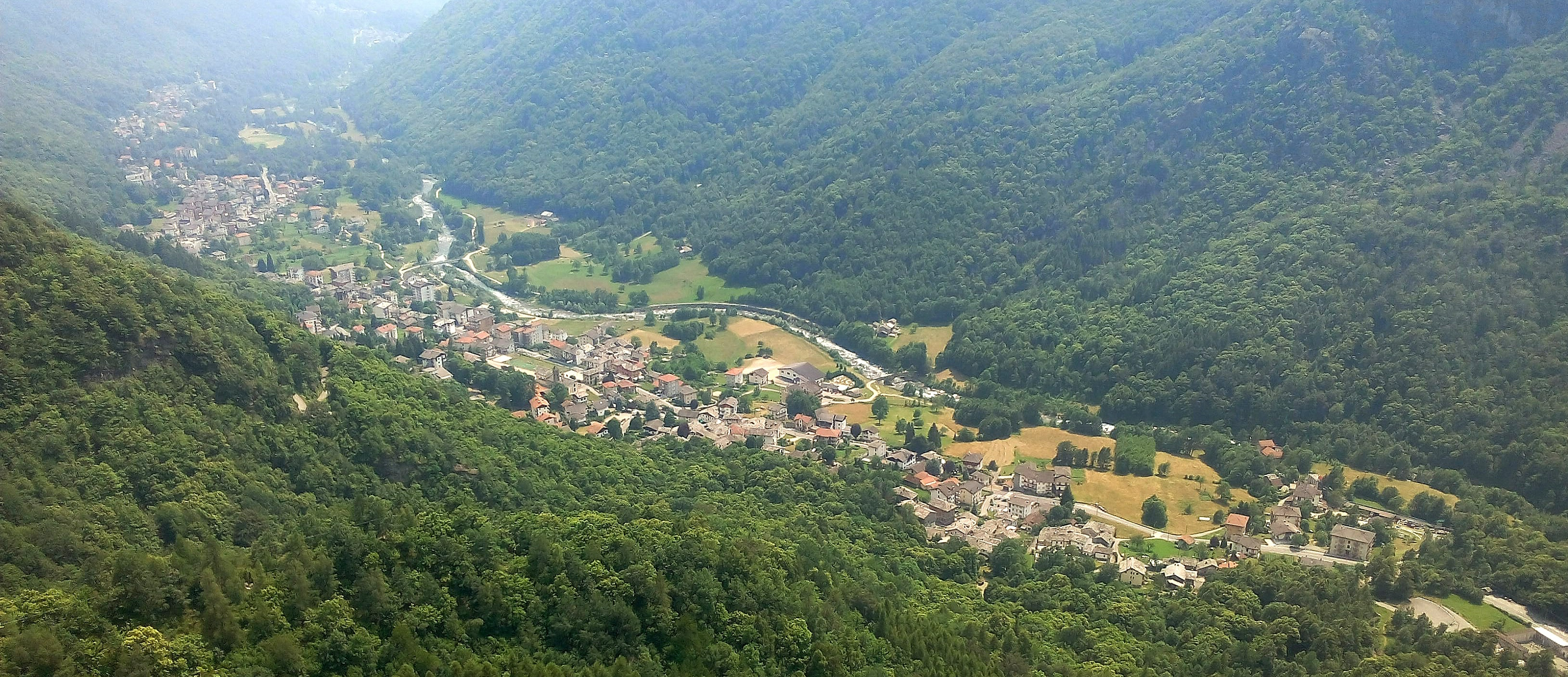

- Location within Italy Location within Piedmont
- Coordinates: 45°21′N 7°23′E
- Country: Italy
- Region: Piedmont
- Metropolitan city: Turin (TO)
- Frazioni: Balme, Boschietto, Bruschi, Case Ghitta, La Rocci, Lities, Losa, Piagni, Ru, Villa, Vru

Government
  - Mayor: Celestina Olivetti

Area
  - Total: 23.03 km^{2} (8.89 sq mi)
- Elevation: 750 m (2,460 ft)

Population (1-1-2017)
  - Total: 563
  - Density: 24.4/km^{2} (63.3/sq mi)
- Demonym: Cantoirese(i)
- Time zone: UTC+1 (CET)
  - Summer (DST): UTC+2 (CEST)
- Postal code: 10070
- Dialing code: 0123
- Website: Official website

Cantoira (Piedmontese: Cantòira, Arpitan: Centuèiri) is a comune (municipality) in the Metropolitan City of Turin in the Italian region Piedmont, located about 40 kilometres (25 mi) northwest of Turin.

Cantoira borders the following municipalities: Locana, Chialamberto, Monastero di Lanzo, and Ceres. The mountain-top Sanctuary of Santa Cristina is present here.
