= Paolo Monti =

Italian photographer (1908–1982)

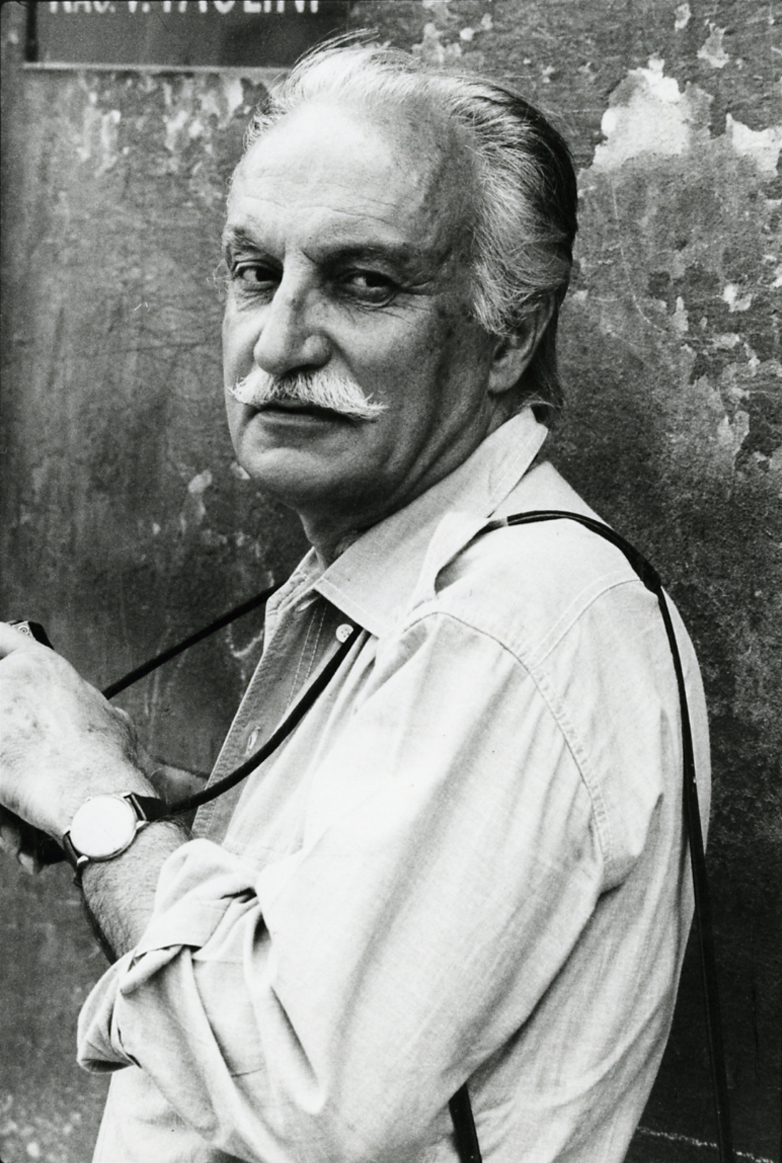
- Monti in 1973
- Born: 11 August 1908; Novara, Kingdom of Italy
- Died: 29 November 1982 (aged 74); Milan, Italy
- Occupations: Photographer; researcher; professor
- Years active: 1953–1982

Paolo Monti (11 August 1908 – 29 November 1982) was an Italian photographer known for his architectural photography.

In his early period, Monti experimented with abstractionism as well as with effects such as blurring and diffraction. In 1953, he became a professional photographer. He mainly worked with architecture reproductions, which were used by magazines and book editors for illustration. Starting from 1966, Monti catalogued the historic centres of Italian cities.

== Early life and education ==
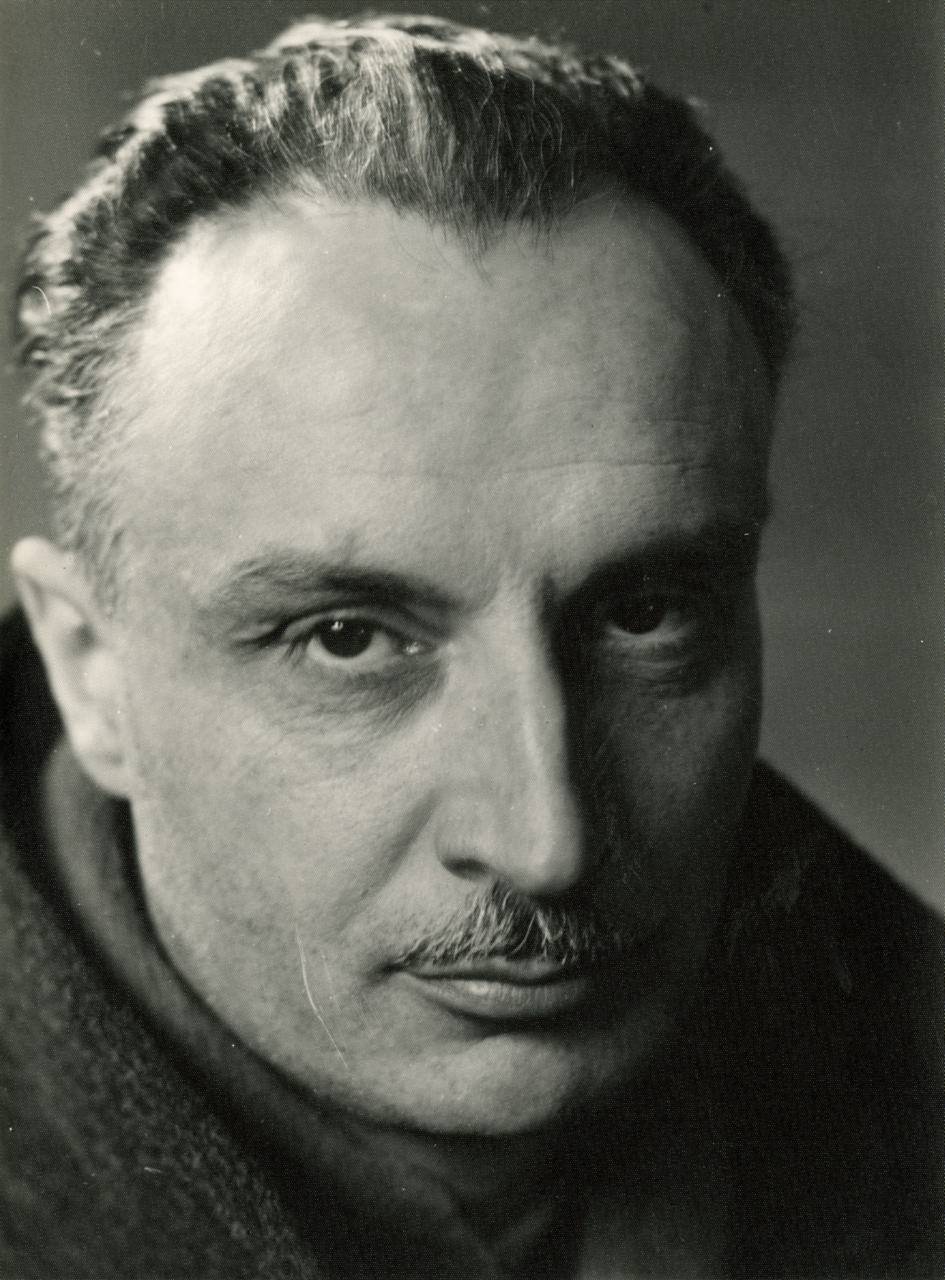
Self-portrait, 1954

Monti was born in Novara. His father was a banker and amateur photographer from Val d'Ossola. His family moved several times as his father was transferred between small towns. He attended Bocconi University in Milan and graduated in Economics in 1930.

== Life and work ==
After graduation, he worked for a few years in the Piedmont region. His father died in 1936 and shortly afterwards Paolo married Maria Binotti.

From 1939 to 1945, he lived in Mestre near Venice, then moved to Venice proper, where he worked at the Regional Agricultural Cooperative and continued his hobby of photography.

In his early period, Monti experimented with abstractionism as well as with effects such as blurring and diffraction. He helped found the club La Gondola in 1947, which shortly became a feature of the international avant-garde photography movement. In 1953, Monti became a professional photographer, working mainly with magazines in the field of architecture and design. He helped illustrate over 200 volumes on cities and regions, architects, and artists.

Starting in about 1965, he photographed illustrations for the history of Italian literature and also photographed Apennine valleys, including the region of Emilia-Romagna. Later, his photography related to Italian art history. After 1980 he concentrated on photographically documenting the heritage of Novara, Lake Orta and Val d'Ossola. For this work, in 1981 he was awarded a national Umberto Zanotti Bianco Prize.

== Death and legacy ==
Monti died in Milan on 29 November 1982.

His archive has been declared of notable historical interest by the Italian Ministry of Cultural Heritage and Activities in 2004 and was acquired by the BEIC Foundation in 2008, catalogued and opened to the public.

== Publications ==
- Paolo Monti. Milan: Gruppo Editoriale Fabbri, 1983. OCLC 42777603. Text by Antonio Arcari.
- Paolo Monti: Fotografo di Brunelleschi: le Architetture Fiorentine. Casalecchio di Reno, Bologna: Grafis, 1986. OCLC 16145381. Edited by Franco Bonilauri. With an essay by Salvatore Di Pasquale, "Filippo Brunelleschi dal mito al mistero" (Filippo Brunelleschi from myth to the mystery). "Catalog of an exhibition held at the Palazzo Strozzi, Florence, 19 July – 12 Aug. 1986".
- Fotografie 1950–1980. Milan: F. Motta, 1993. ISBN 9788871790282. Edited by Giovanni Chiaramonte.

== Exhibitions ==
- First Biennial International Photographic Exhibition, Venice, 1957.

== Collections ==
Monti's work is held in the following permanent collection:

- Sforza Castle Pinacoteca, Sforza Castle Museums, Milan

== Gallery ==
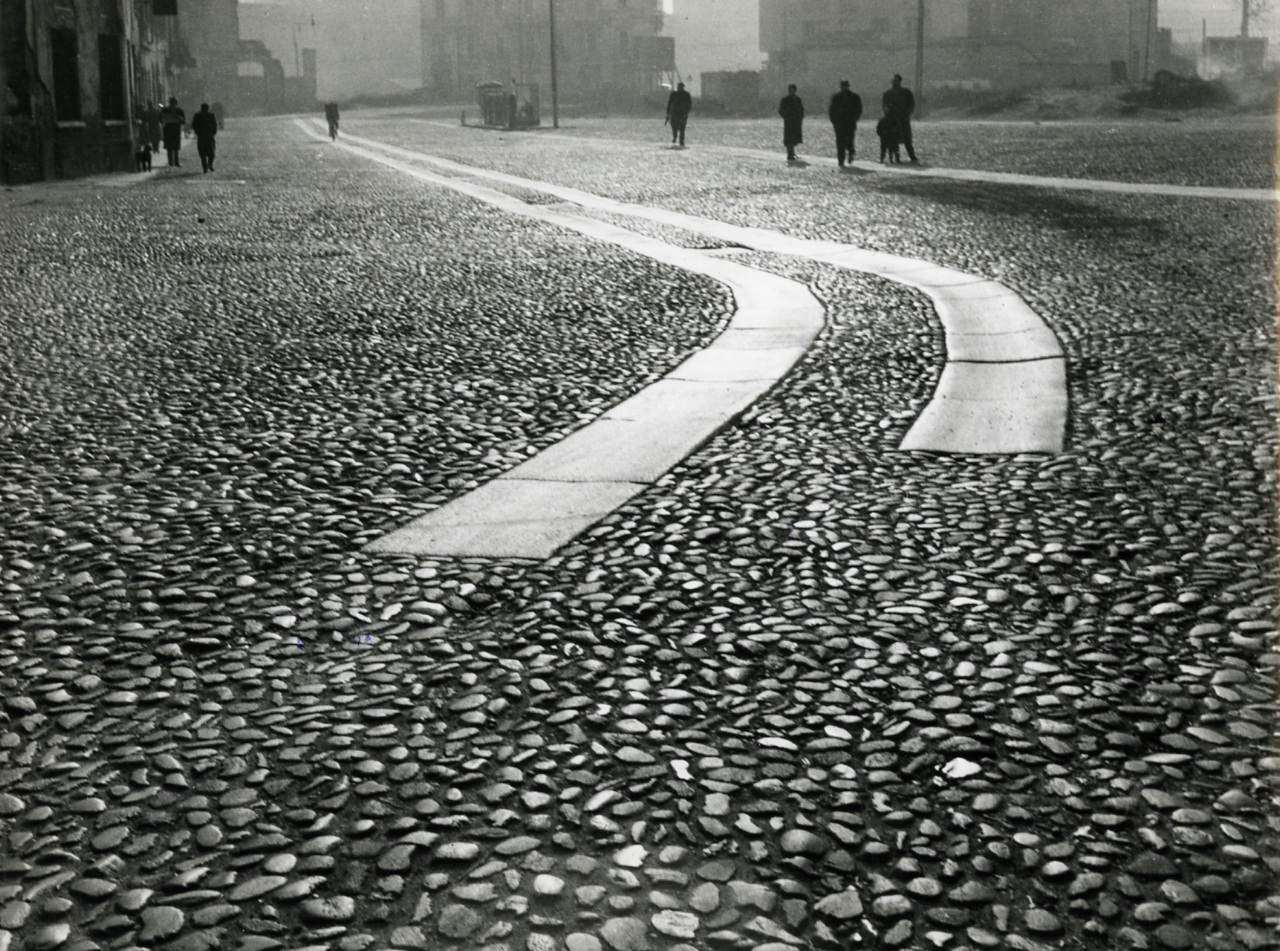
Lo spazio della memoria. Piazza della Vetra nel 1953 ("The space of memory. Vetra's square in 1953") – Milan, 1953

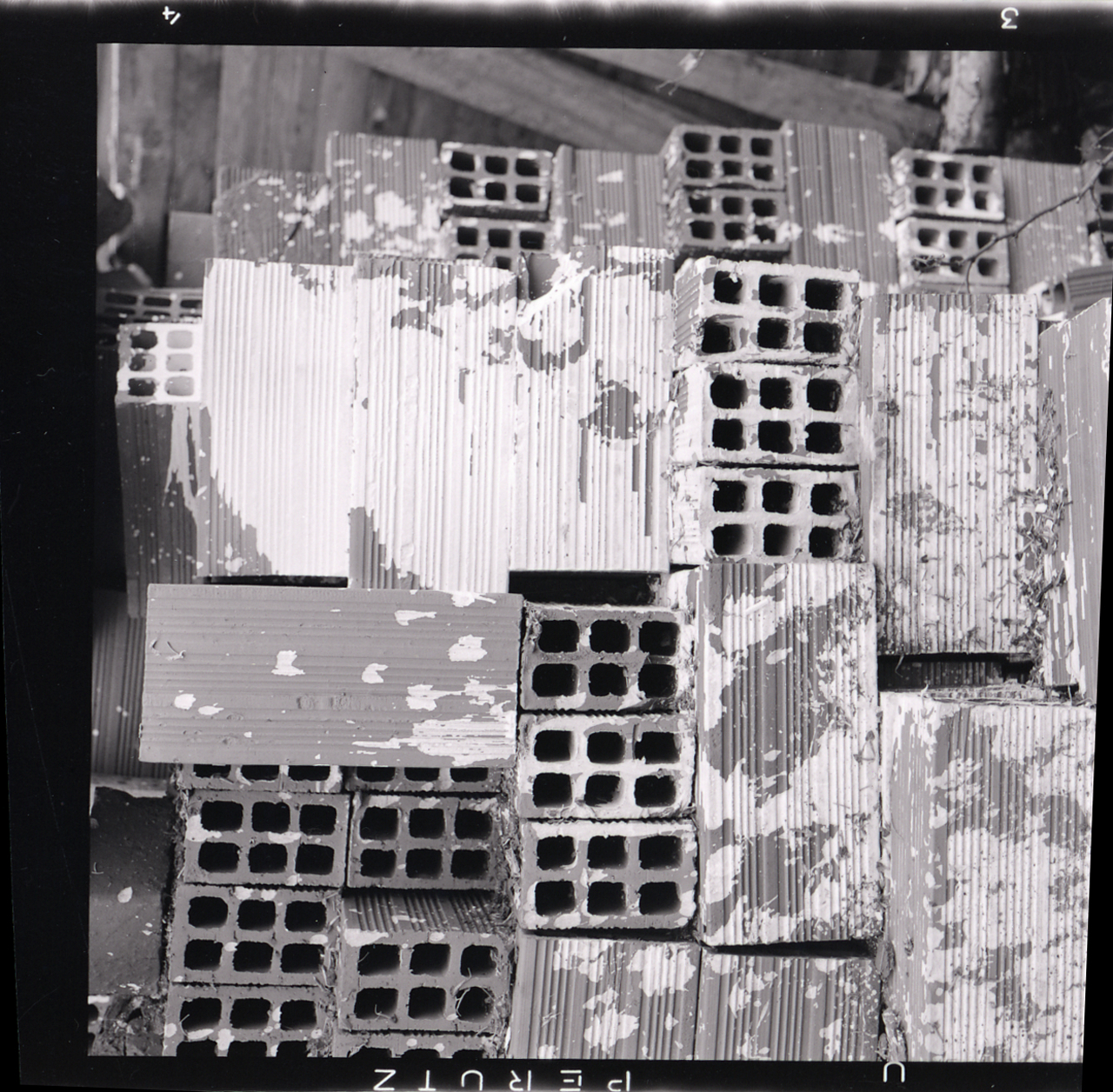
Anzola d'Ossola, 1964

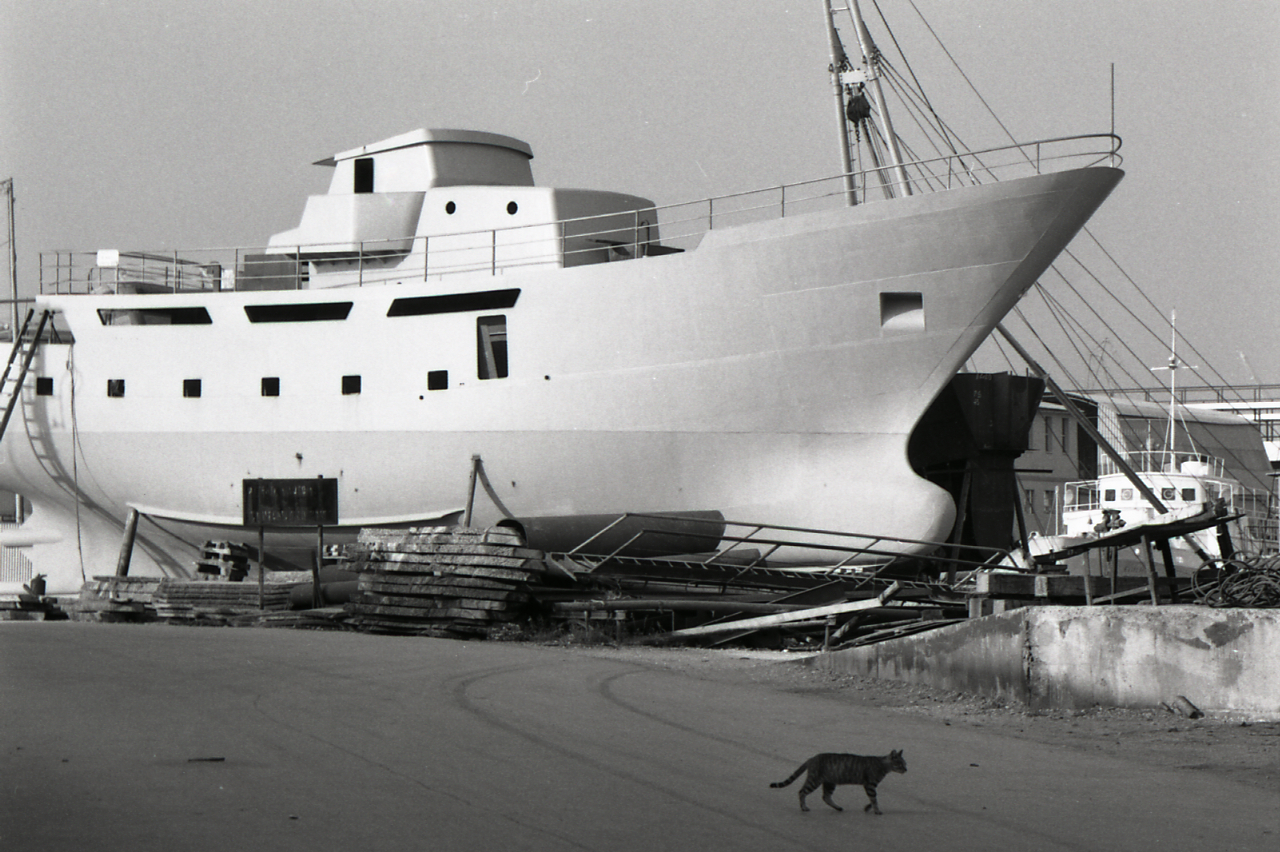
Ancona, 1969

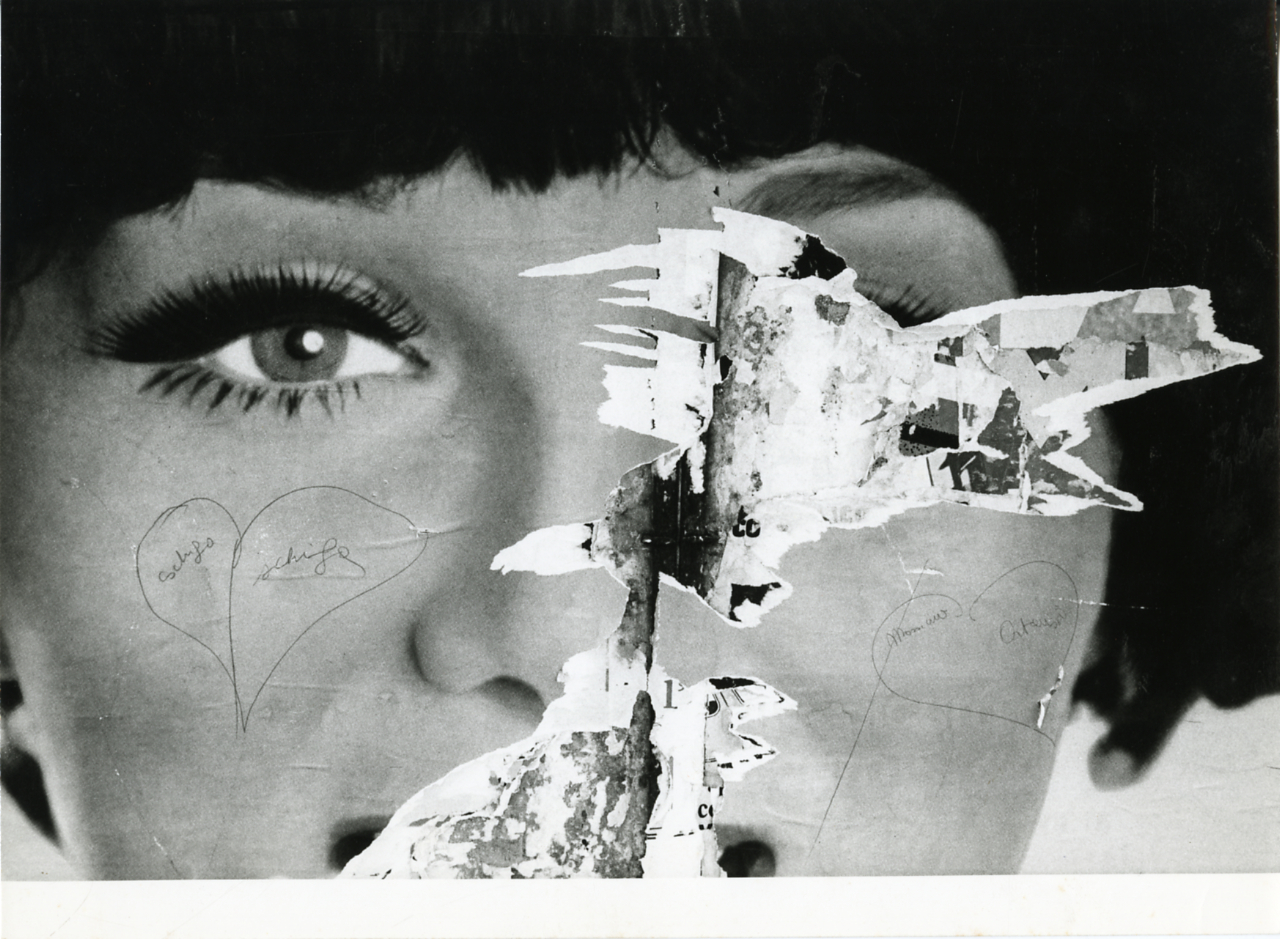
Manifesto strappato ("Ripped poster") – Venice, 1971

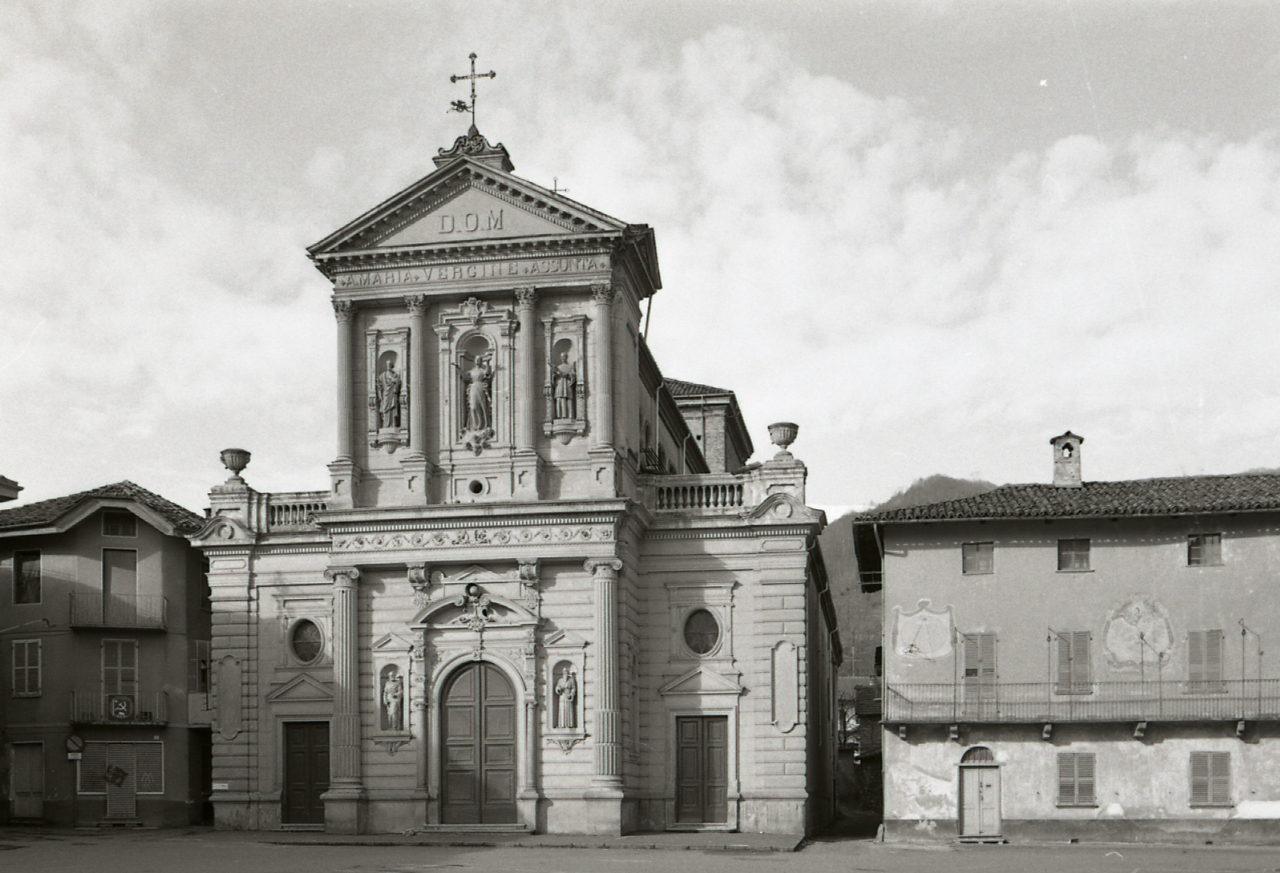
Rocca Canavese, 1979

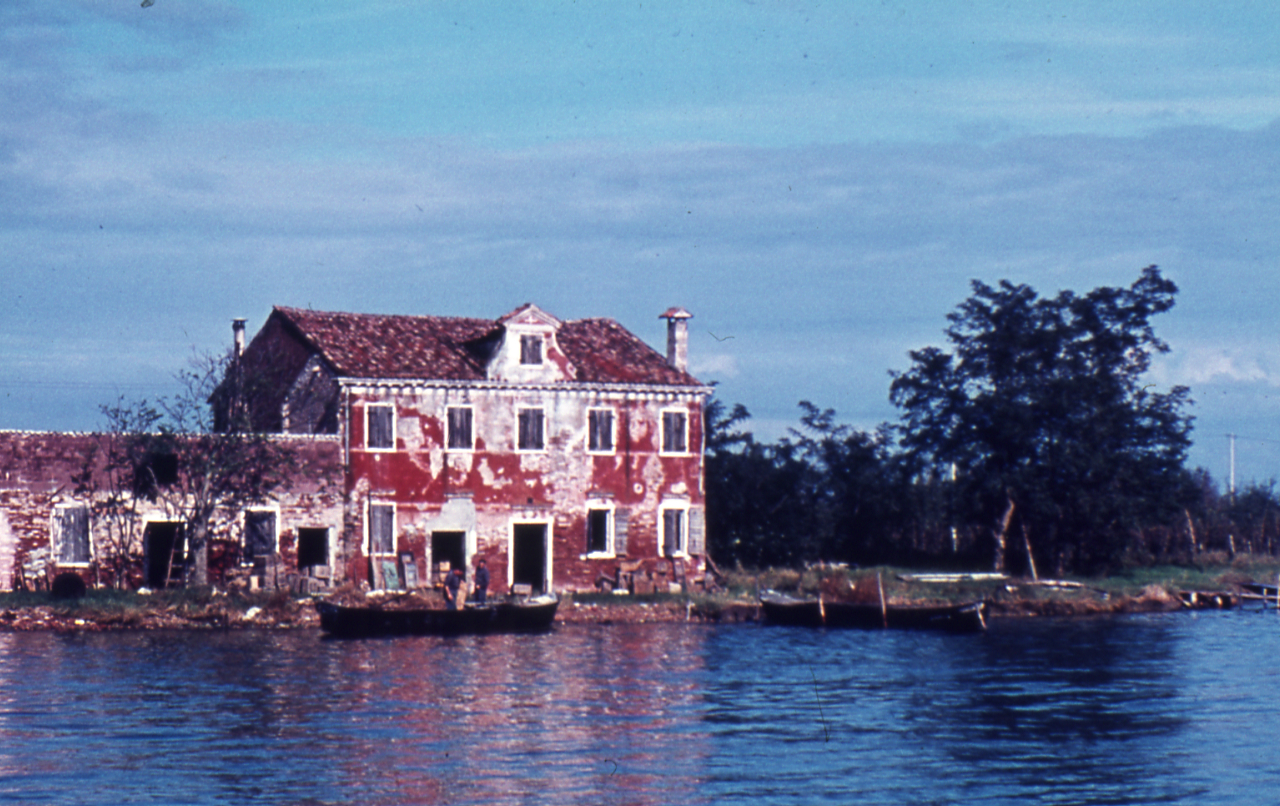
Venetian Lagoon, 1982

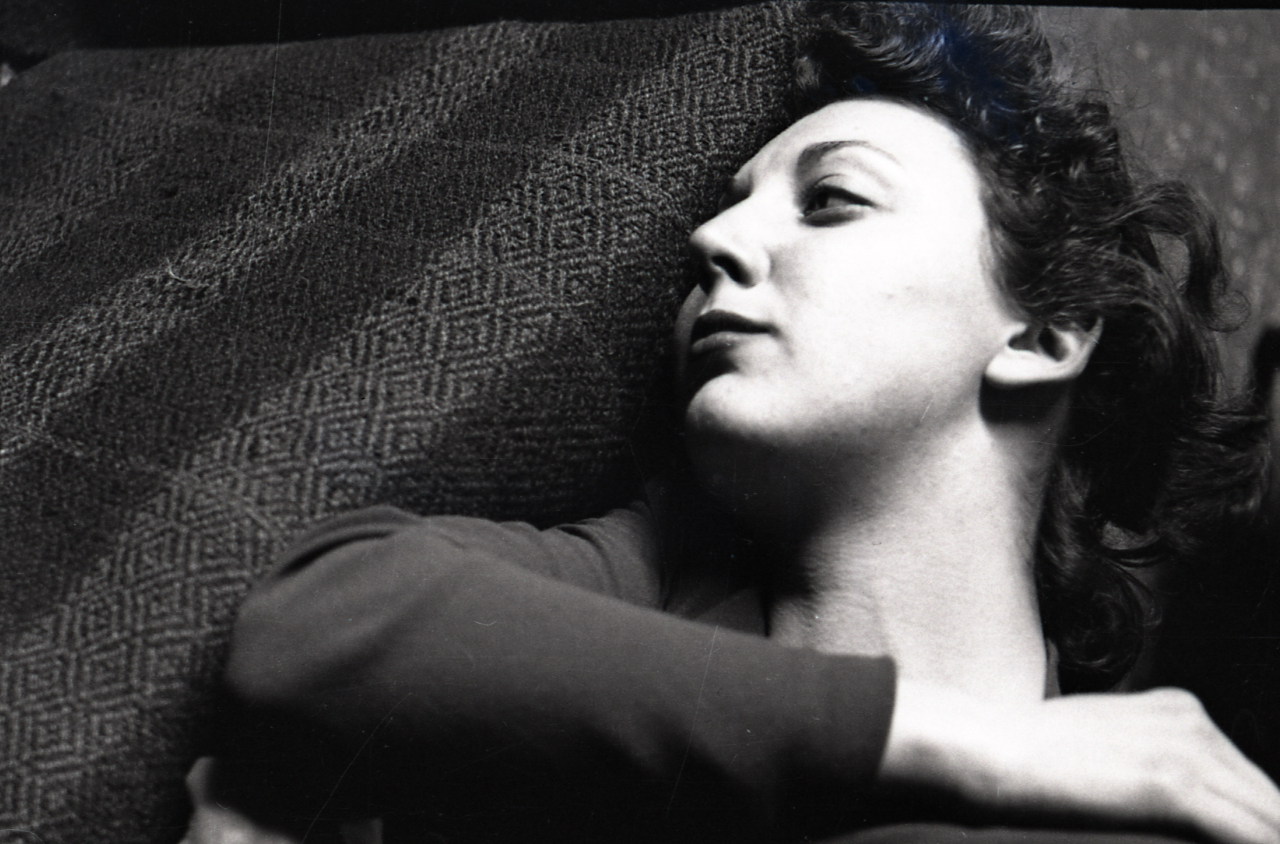
Lady's portrait, 1970
