= Coassolo Torinese =

Coassolo Torinese Coasseul ëd Turin (Piedmontese) Cuasöl (Arpitan)
- Comune
- Comune di Coassolo Torinese
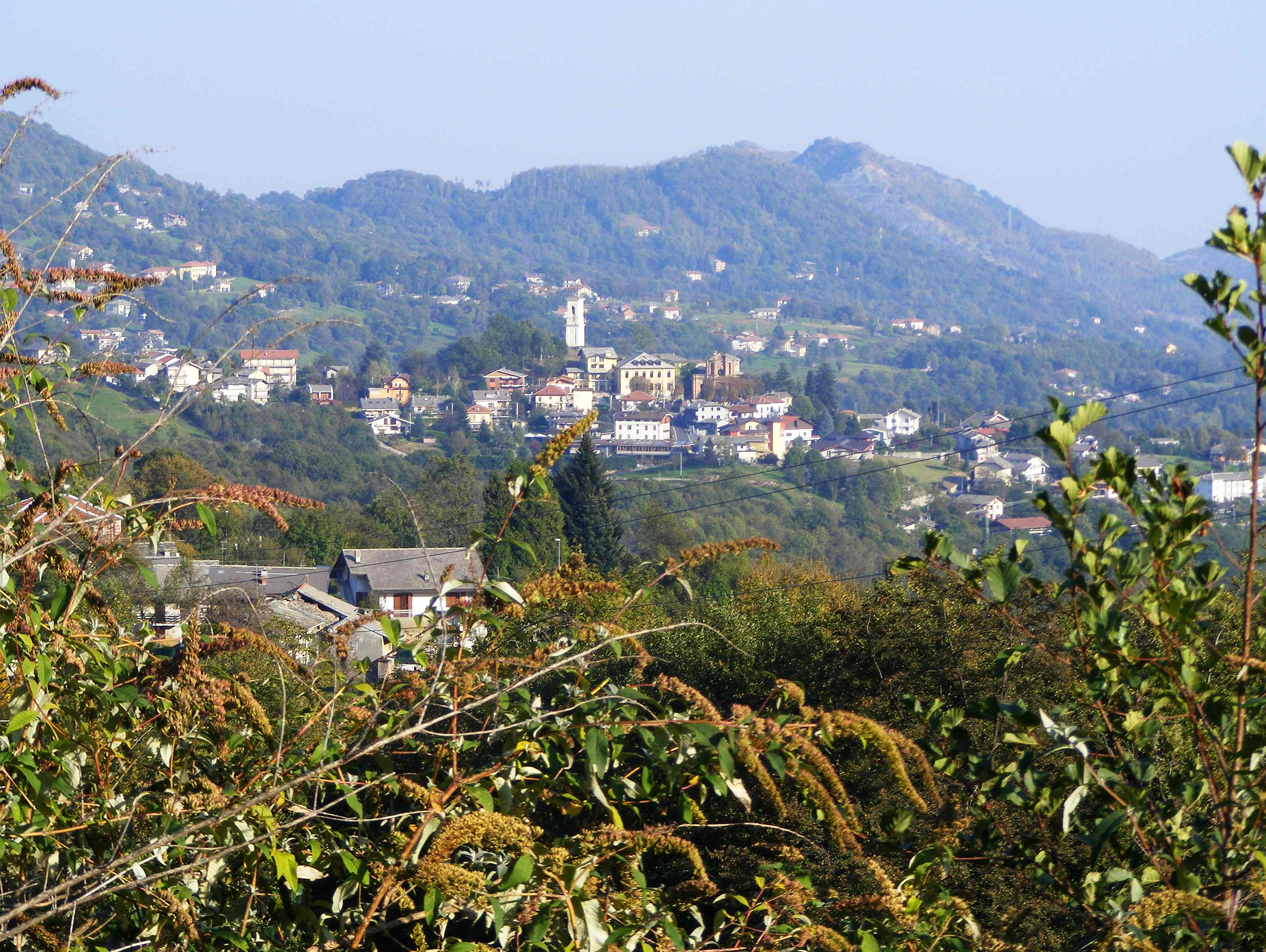

- Coat of arms

- Location within Italy Location within Piedmont
- Coordinates: 45°18′N 7°28′E
- Country: Italy
- Region: Piedmont
- Metropolitan city: Turin (TO)
- Frazioni: Airola, Banche, Benne, Bivio Tet, Bogno, Brich, Case Ferrando, Castiglione, Saccona, San Grato, San Nicolao, San Pietro, Vauda, Vietti

Government
  - Mayor: Franco Musso

Area
  - Total: 28.0 km^{2} (10.8 sq mi)
- Elevation: 742 m (2,434 ft)

Population (30 November 2017)
  - Total: 1,515
  - Density: 54.1/km^{2} (140/sq mi)
- Demonym: Coassolesi
- Time zone: UTC+1 (CET)
  - Summer (DST): UTC+2 (CEST)
- Postal code: 10070
- Dialing code: 0123
- Website: Official website

Coassolo Torinese (Piedmontese: Coasseul ëd Turin, Arpitan: Cuasöl) is a comune (municipality) in the Metropolitan City of Turin in the Italian region Piedmont, located about 30 kilometres (19 mi) northwest of Turin.

Coassolo Torinese borders the following municipalities: Locana, Corio, Monastero di Lanzo, Balangero, and Lanzo Torinese.
