= Forno Canavese =

- Comune
- Comune di Forno Canavese
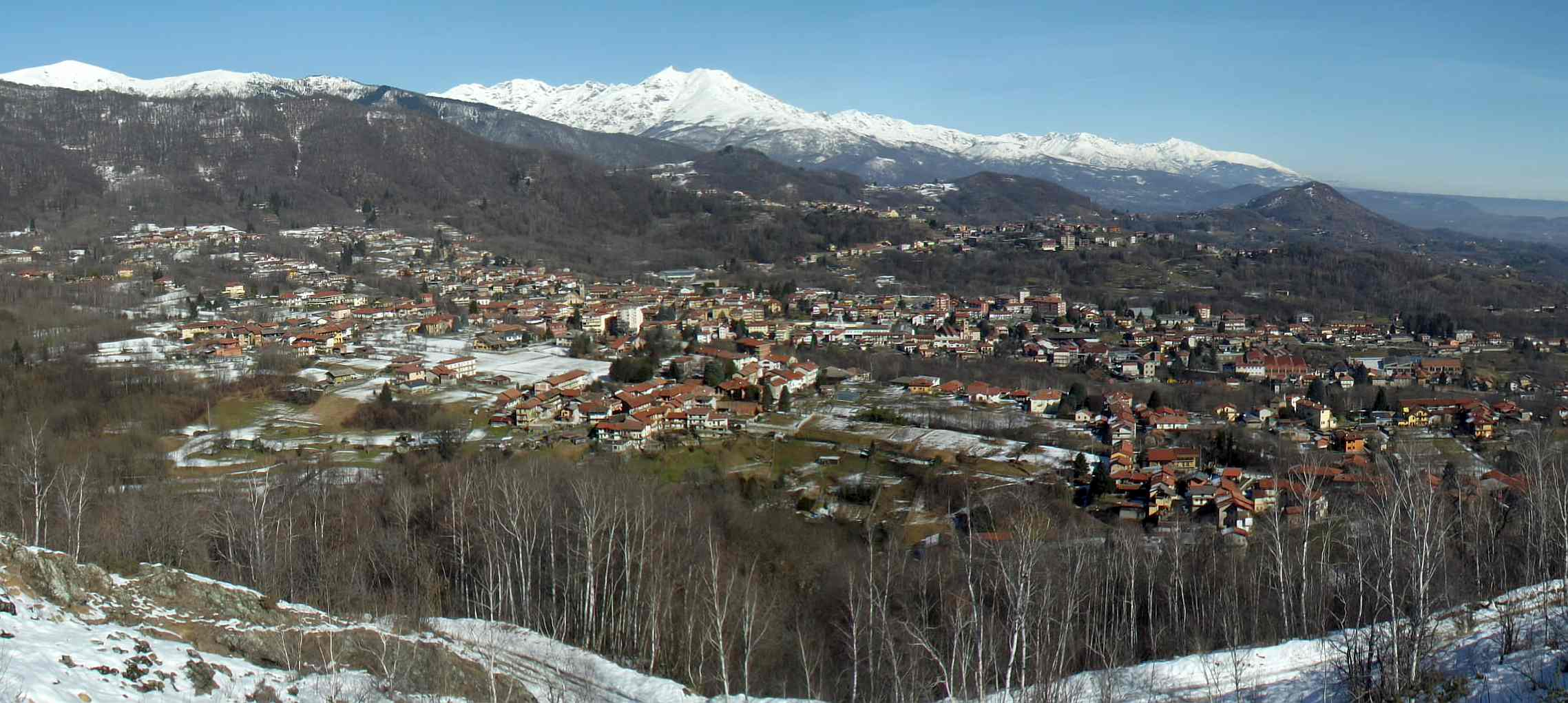

- Location within Italy Location within Piedmont
- Coordinates: 45°21′N 7°35′E
- Country: Italy
- Region: Piedmont
- Metropolitan city: Turin (TO)

Government
  - Mayor: Giuseppe Boggia

Area
  - Total: 16.7 km^{2} (6.4 sq mi)
- Elevation: 584 m (1,916 ft)

Population (31 December 2010)
  - Total: 3,691
  - Density: 221/km^{2} (572/sq mi)
- Demonym: Fornesi
- Time zone: UTC+1 (CET)
  - Summer (DST): UTC+2 (CEST)
- Postal code: 10084
- Dialing code: 0124

Forno Canavese is a comune (municipality) in the Metropolitan City of Turin in the Italian region Piedmont, located about 35 kilometres (22 mi) northwest of Turin.

Forno Canavese borders the following municipalities: Pratiglione, Corio, Rivara, Rocca Canavese, and Levone.
