= Corio, Piedmont =

Corio Cheuri (Piedmontese) Koeri (Arpitan)
- Comune
- Comune di Corio
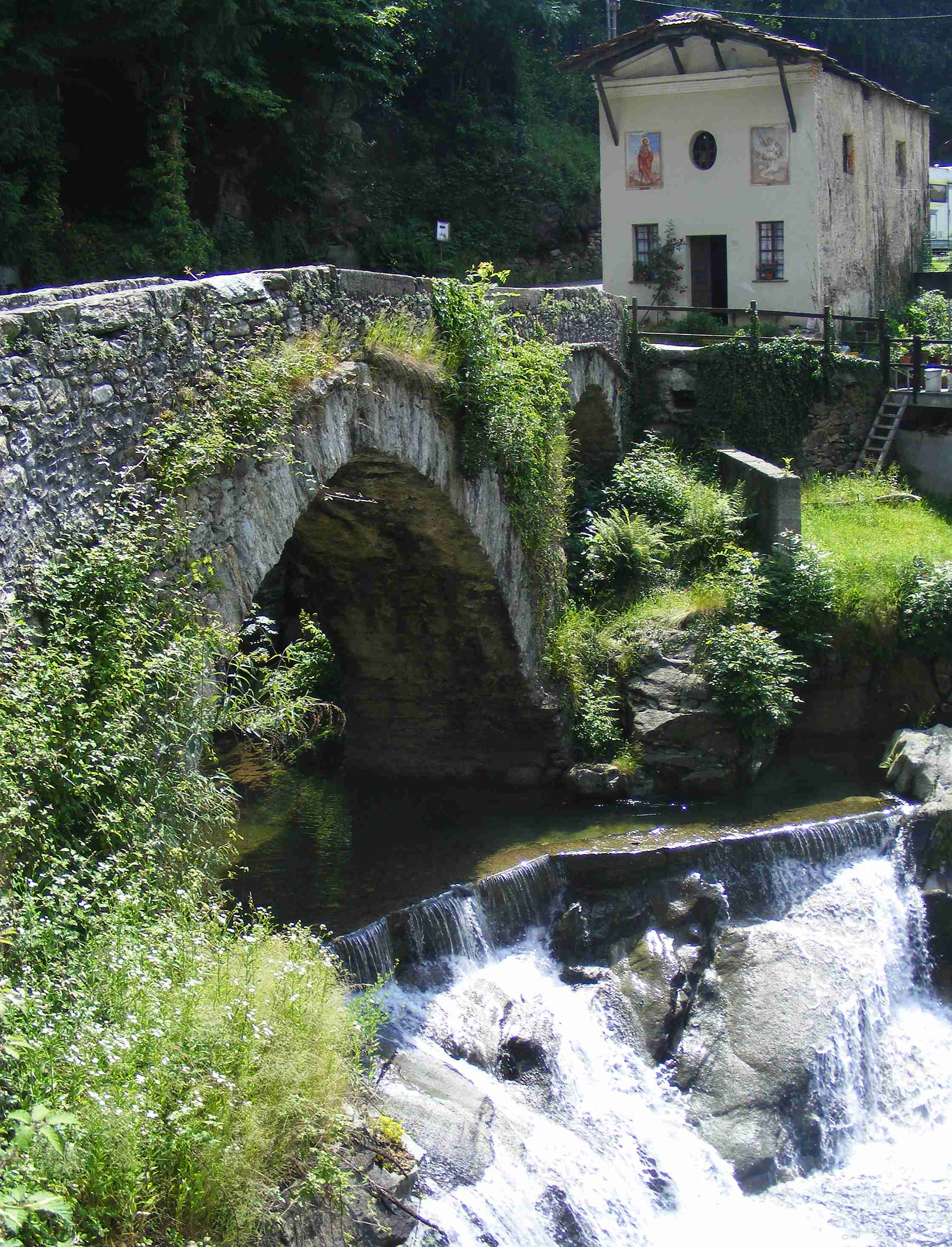
- Bridge on the Malone river.

- Coat of arms

- Location within Italy Location within Piedmont
- Coordinates: 45°19′N 7°32′E
- Country: Italy
- Region: Piedmont
- Metropolitan city: Turin (TO)

Government
  - Mayor: Susanna Costa Flora

Area
  - Total: 41.49 km^{2} (16.02 sq mi)
- Elevation: 625 m (2,051 ft)

Population (30 November 2017)
  - Total: 3,250
  - Density: 78.3/km^{2} (203/sq mi)
- Demonym: Coriesi
- Time zone: UTC+1 (CET)
  - Summer (DST): UTC+2 (CEST)
- Postal code: 10070
- Dialing code: 011
- Website: Official website

Corio (Piedmontese: Cheuri, Arpitan: Koeri) is a comune (municipality) in the Metropolitan City of Turin in the Italian region of Piedmont, located about 30 kilometres (19 mi) northwest of Turin.

Corio borders the following municipalities: Locana, Sparone, Pratiglione, Forno Canavese, Coassolo Torinese, Rocca Canavese, Balangero, Mathi, Nole, and Grosso.

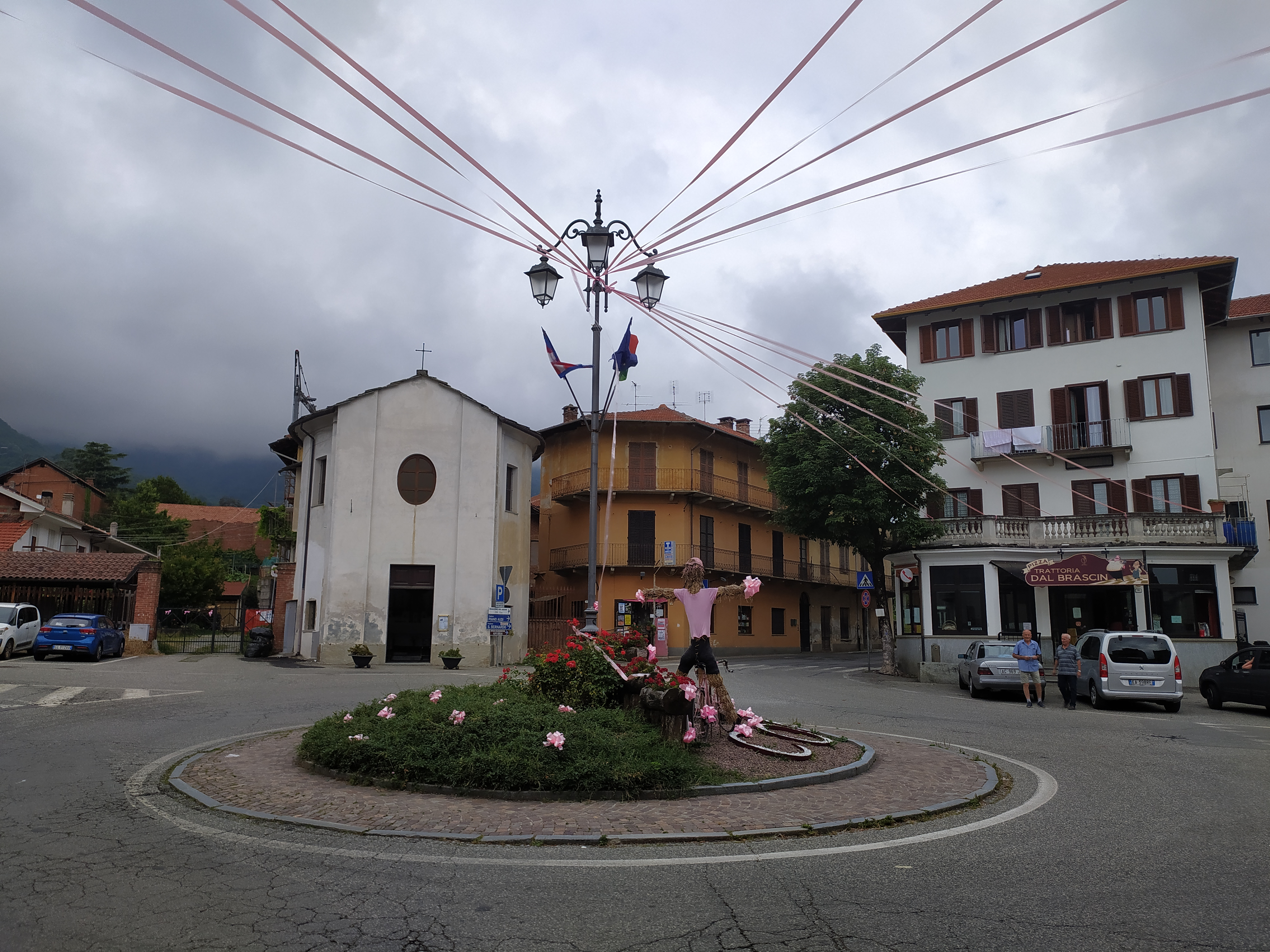
