= Grosso Castle =

- Castello di Grosso
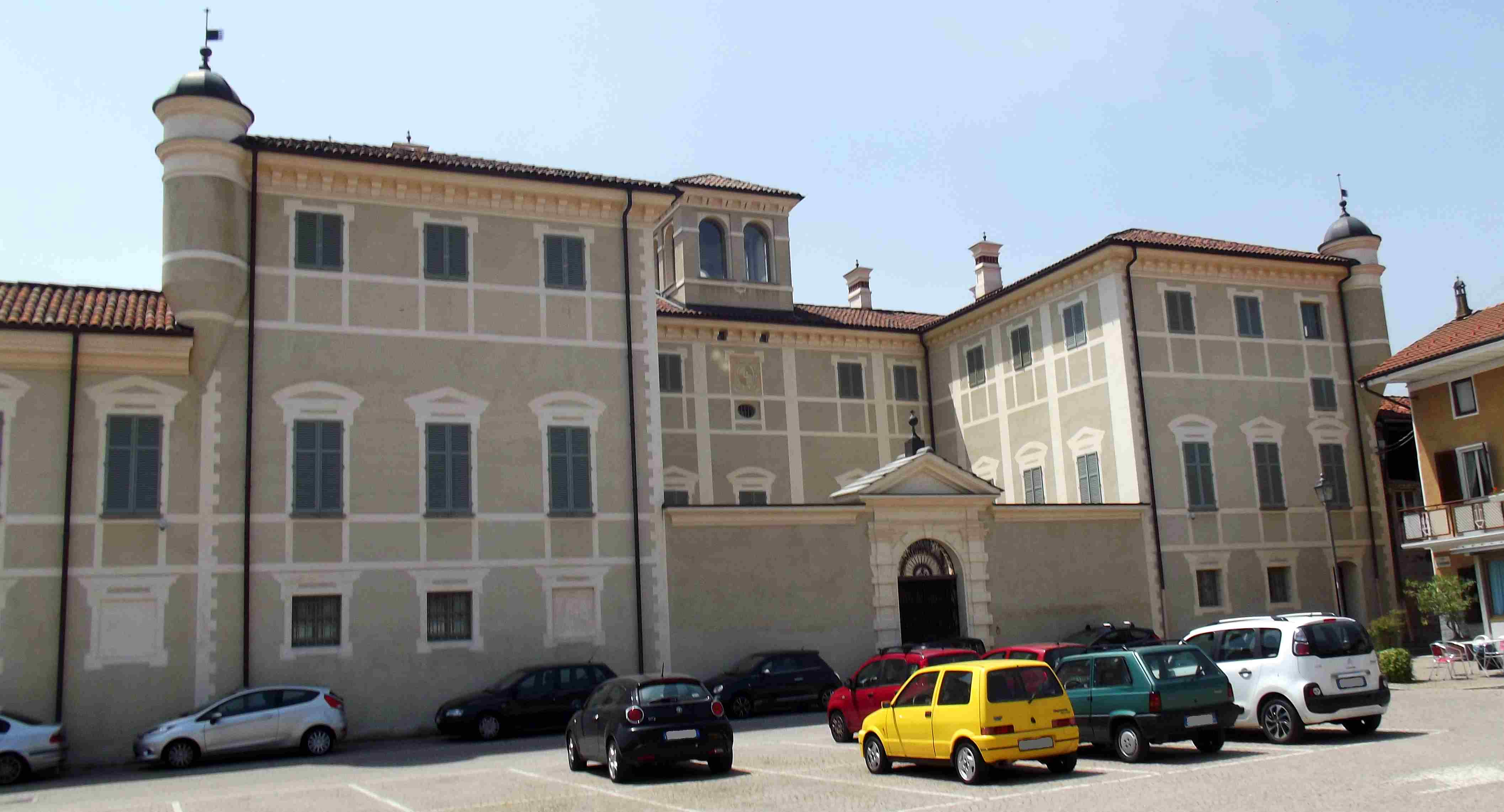
- Grosso Castle in 2014
- Click on the map for a fullscreen view

General information
- Location: Grosso, Italy
- Coordinates: 45°15′26.6″N 7°33′28.37″E

Grosso Castle (Italian: Castello di Grosso), also known as Palazzo Armano, is a castle located in Grosso, Piedmont, Italy.

== History ==
The castle is the result of the reconstruction carried out in 1655 by brothers Giovanni, Giacomo, and Bernardino Armano, Counts of Grosso and Villanova, on the ruins of an older medieval castle. The reconstruction not only reaffirmed the family's dominance over the area but also led to the construction of the private chapel dedicated to the Holy Shroud, as evidenced by a plaque preserved inside the chapel itself.

== Description ==
The castle consists of a large three-story central structure facing a square, with a lower side wing ending in the chapel. The façade is characterized by two large projecting sections with small hanging towers and a central tower. Inside, the rooms are richly decorated with frescoes and coffered ceilings. The grand hall, adorned with painted beams and rosettes, reflects the 17th-century Baroque style. The property also includes an Italian garden.

== Gallery ==
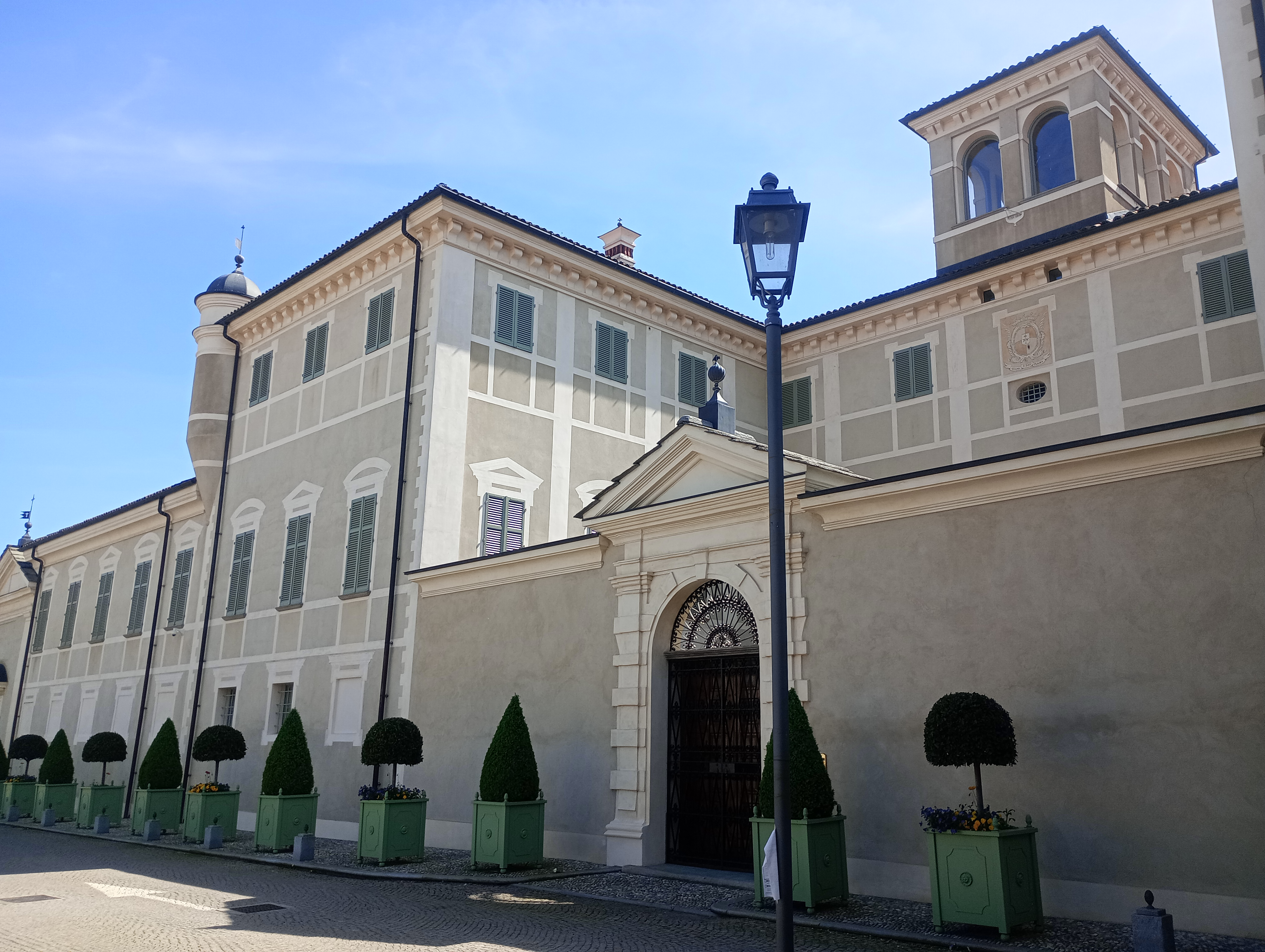

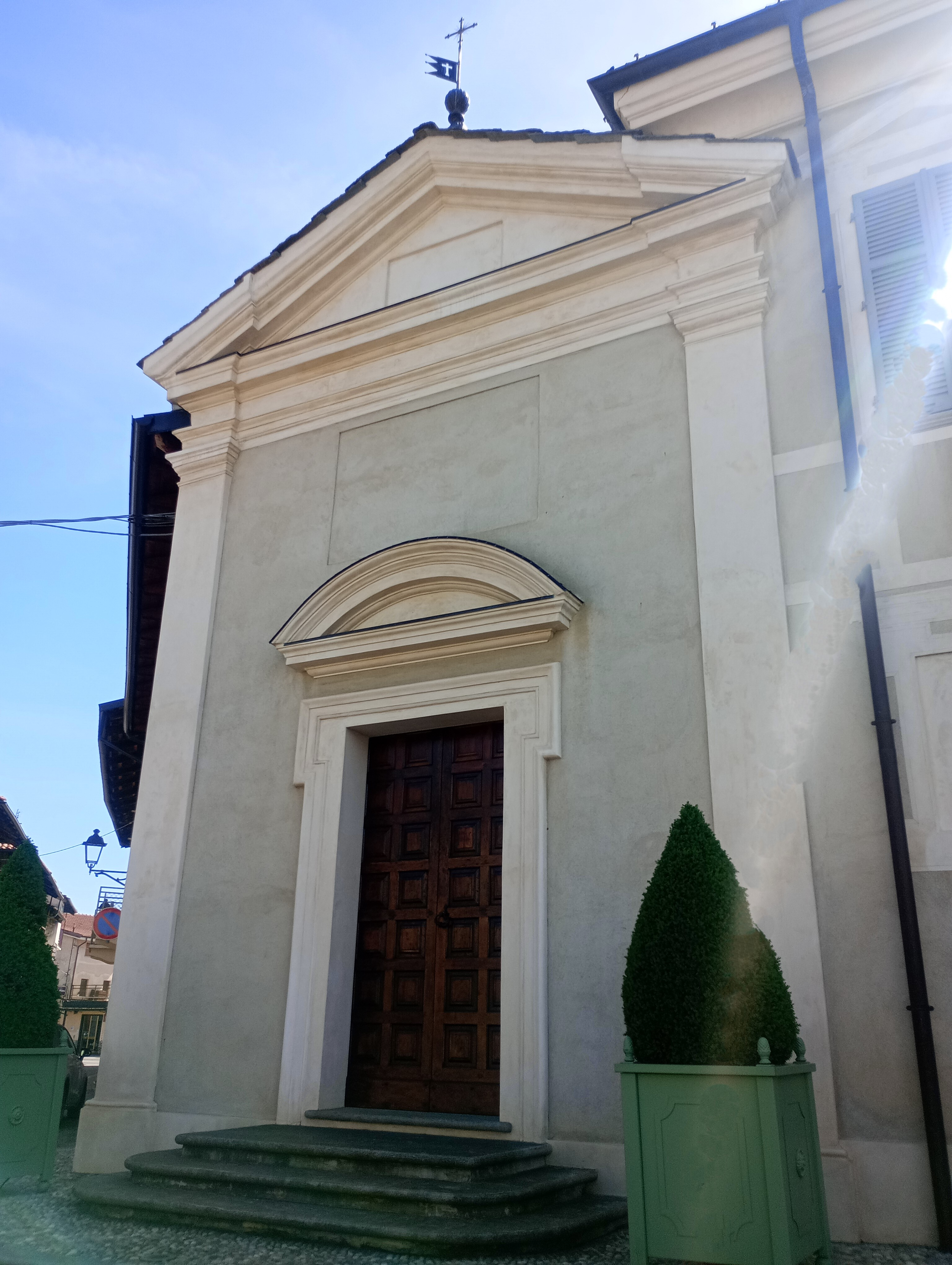
