= San Carlo Canavese =

- Comune
- Comune di San Carlo Canavese
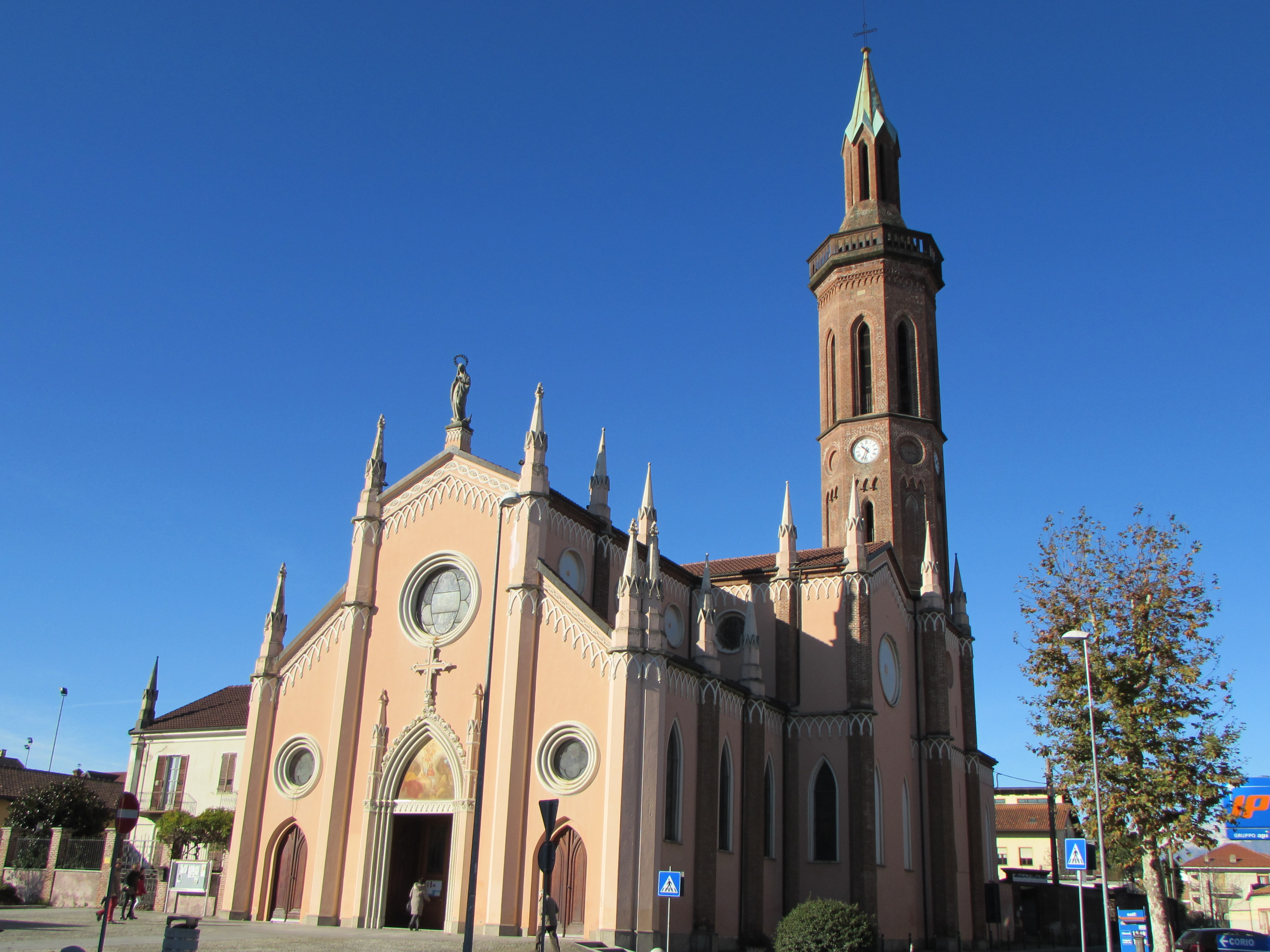
- Parish church.

- Coat of arms

- Location within Italy Location within Piedmont
- Coordinates: 45°15′N 7°37′E
- Country: Italy
- Region: Piedmont
- Metropolitan city: Turin (TO)

Government
  - Mayor: Ugo Giuseppe Guido Papurello

Area
  - Total: 21.0 km^{2} (8.1 sq mi)
- Elevation: 370 m (1,210 ft)

Population (31 December 2014)
  - Total: 4,024
  - Density: 192/km^{2} (496/sq mi)
- Demonym: Sancarlesi
- Time zone: UTC+1 (CET)
  - Summer (DST): UTC+2 (CEST)
- Postal code: 10070
- Dialing code: 011
- Website: Official website

San Carlo Canavese is a comune (municipality) of the Metropolitan City of Turin, Italy, located about 20 kilometres (12 mi) northwest of Turin. It was established in 16th century by emancipating itsel from Ciriè's marquisdom. Until 1827 its name was "Vauda di Ciriè", from the ancient german language "Wald" meaning "forest". From the same age, the little town hosts an artillery shooting range. The only monumental richness is a little church, rest of an abbey church: this church, that saves some parts romanesque, namely the tower and an apse, is dedicated to Saint Mary; remarkable is also a cycle of frescoes, decorating the apse, and dated to 15th century.

San Carlo Canavese borders the following municipalities: Rocca Canavese, Vauda Canavese, Nole, Front, San Francesco al Campo, Cirié, and San Maurizio Canavese.
