= Grosso, Piedmont =

Grosso
- Comune
- Comune di Grosso
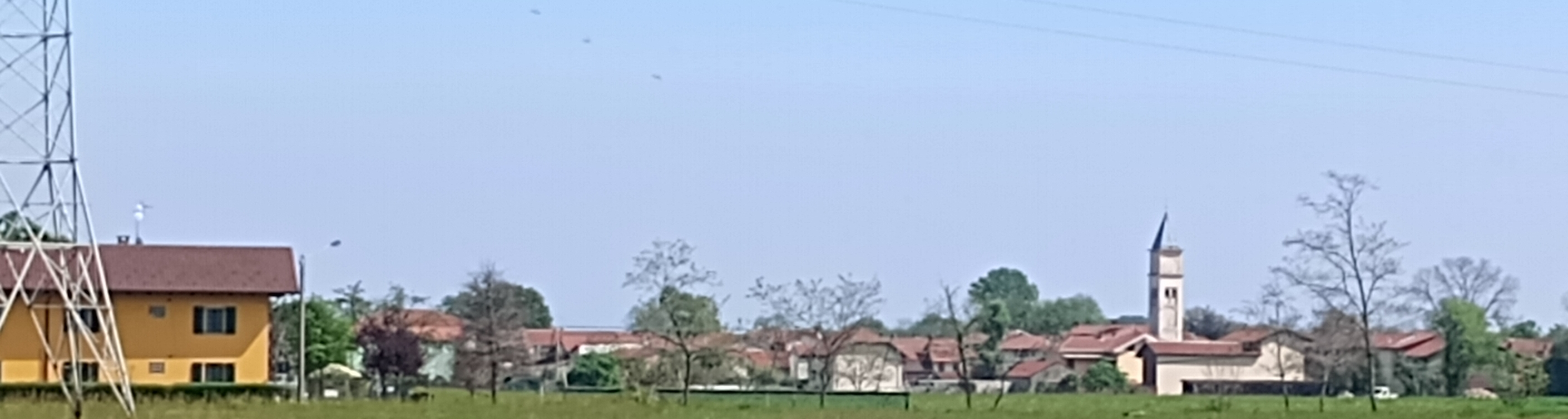

- Location within Italy Location within Piedmont
- Coordinates: 45°16′N 7°34′E
- Country: Italy
- Region: Piedmont
- Metropolitan city: Turin (TO)

Government
  - Mayor: Lorenzo Spingore

Area
  - Total: 4.3 km^{2} (1.7 sq mi)
- Elevation: 394 m (1,293 ft)

Population (31 December 2010)
  - Total: 1,055
  - Density: 250/km^{2} (640/sq mi)
- Demonym: Grossesi
- Time zone: UTC+1 (CET)
  - Summer (DST): UTC+2 (CEST)
- Postal code: 10070
- Dialing code: 011

Grosso is a comune (municipality) in the Metropolitan City of Turin in the Italian region Piedmont, located about 25 kilometres (16 mi) northwest of Turin.

Grosso borders the following municipalities: Corio, Mathi, Nole, and Villanova Canavese.

Main sights include Grosso Castle.
