= Rocca Canavese =

- Comune
- Comune di Rocca Canavese
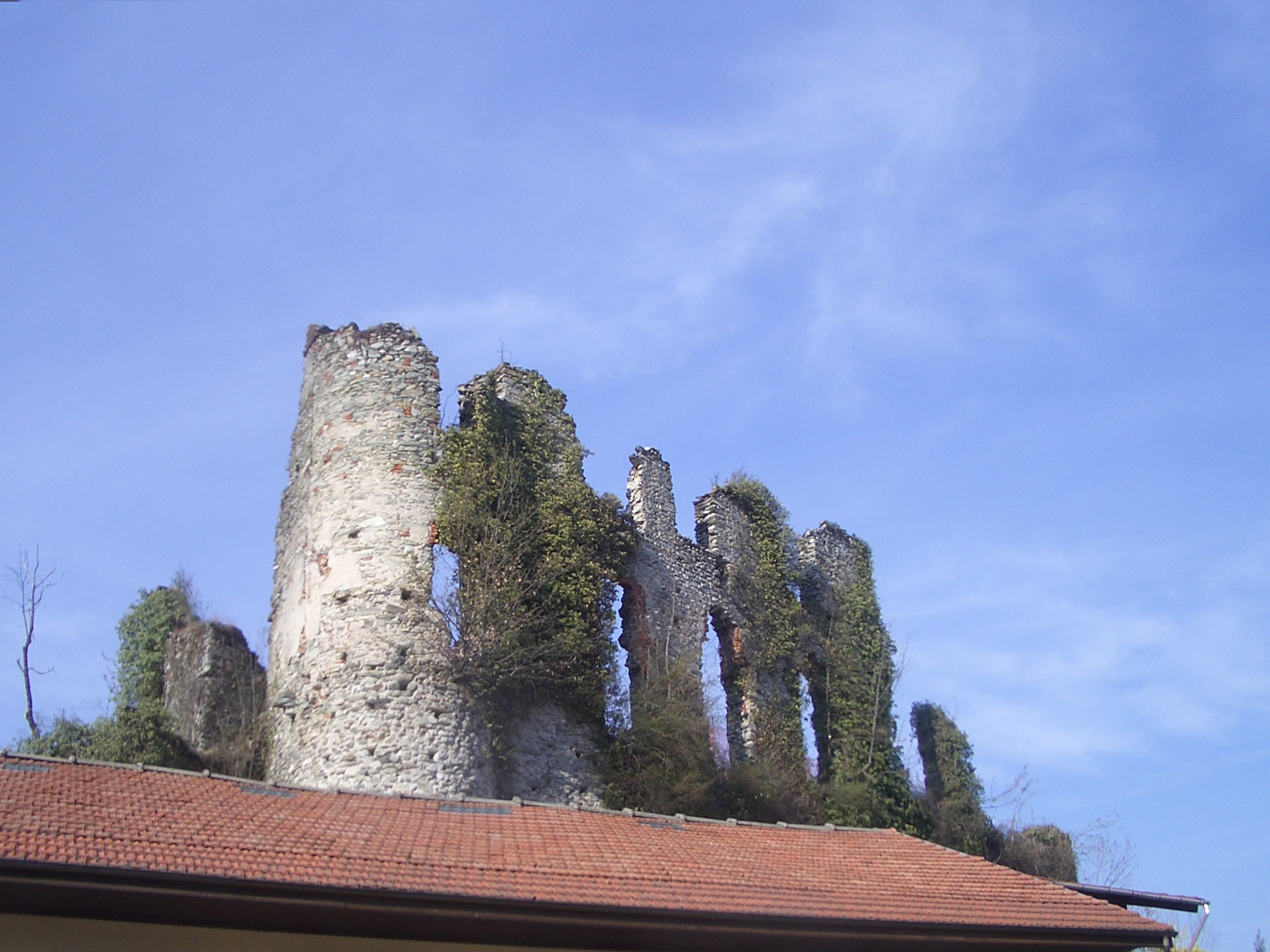
- Remains of the castle (Rocca).

- Coat of arms

- Location within Italy Location within Piedmont
- Coordinates: 45°19′N 7°35′E
- Country: Italy
- Region: Piedmont
- Metropolitan city: Turin (TO)

Government
  - Mayor: Alessandro Lajolo

Area
  - Total: 14.2 km^{2} (5.5 sq mi)
- Elevation: 421 m (1,381 ft)

Population (31 December 2010)
  - Total: 1,781
  - Density: 125/km^{2} (325/sq mi)
- Demonym: Rocchesi
- Time zone: UTC+1 (CET)
  - Summer (DST): UTC+2 (CEST)
- Postal code: 10070
- Dialing code: 011
- Website: Official website

Rocca Canavese is a comune (municipality) in the Metropolitan City of Turin in the Italian region Piedmont, located about 30 kilometres (19 mi) northwest of Turin.

Rocca Canavese borders the following municipalities: Corio, Forno Canavese, Levone, Barbania, Vauda Canavese, Nole and San Carlo Canavese. Sights include the Santa Croce Chapel, with 15th-16th centuries frescoes, and remains of the Rocca (castle)

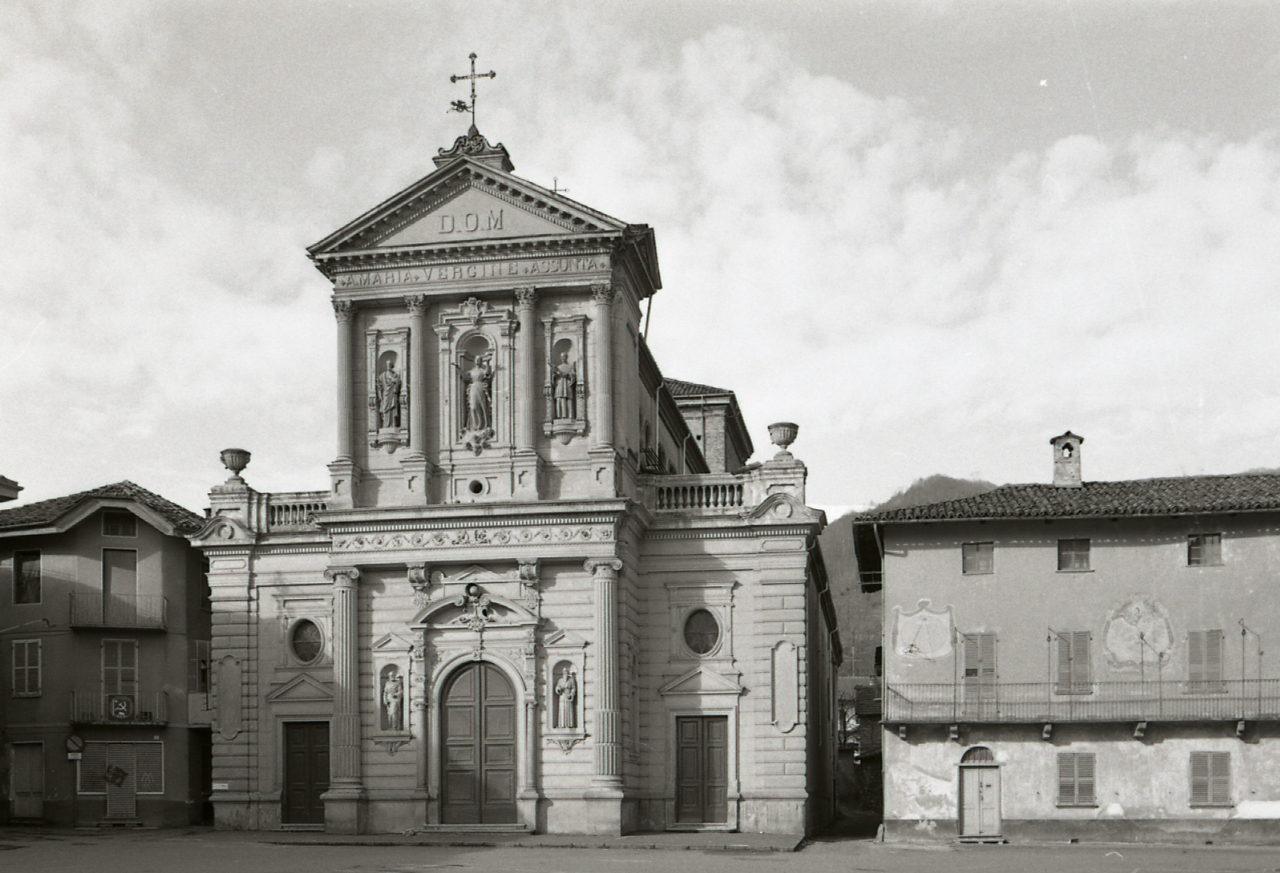
Parish church of Rocca Canavese, photo by Paolo Monti, 1979.
