= Monastero di Lanzo =

Monastero di Lanzo Monasté 'd Lans (Piedmontese) Moutier (Arpitan)
- Comune
- Comune di Monastero di Lanzo
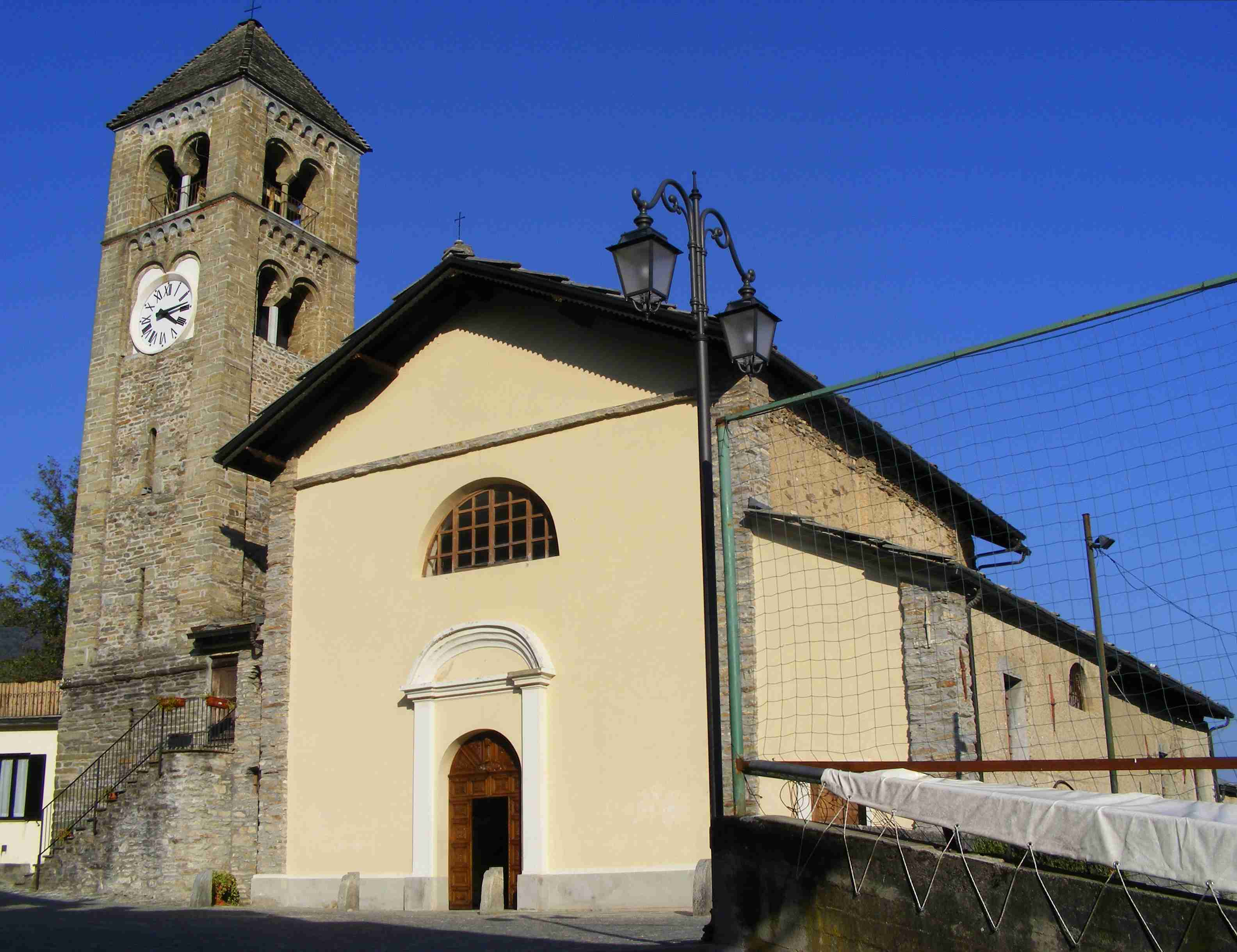
- Parish church.

- Coat of arms

- Location within Italy Location within Piedmont
- Coordinates: 45°18′N 7°26′E
- Country: Italy
- Region: Piedmont
- Metropolitan city: Turin (TO)
- Frazioni: Chiaves, Cresto, Cà di Savi, Cà di Sciold, Fornelli, Marsaglia, Mecca, Menulla, Monastero di sotto, San Rocco, Sistina, Stabio

Government
  - Mayor: Maurizio Togliatti

Area
  - Total: 17.6 km^{2} (6.8 sq mi)
- Elevation: 825 m (2,707 ft)

Population (31 October 2017)
  - Total: 352
  - Density: 20.0/km^{2} (51.8/sq mi)
- Demonym: Monasteresi
- Time zone: UTC+1 (CET)
  - Summer (DST): UTC+2 (CEST)
- Postal code: 10070
- Dialing code: 0123
- Website: Official website

Monastero di Lanzo (Piedmontese: Monasté 'd Lans, Arpitan: Moutier) is a comune (municipality) in the Metropolitan City of Turin in the Italian region Piedmont, located about 35 km northwest of Turin.

Monastero di Lanzo borders the following municipalities: Locana, Cantoira, Coassolo Torinese, Ceres, Pessinetto, and Lanzo Torinese.
