= Cafasse =

- Comune
- Comune di Cafasse
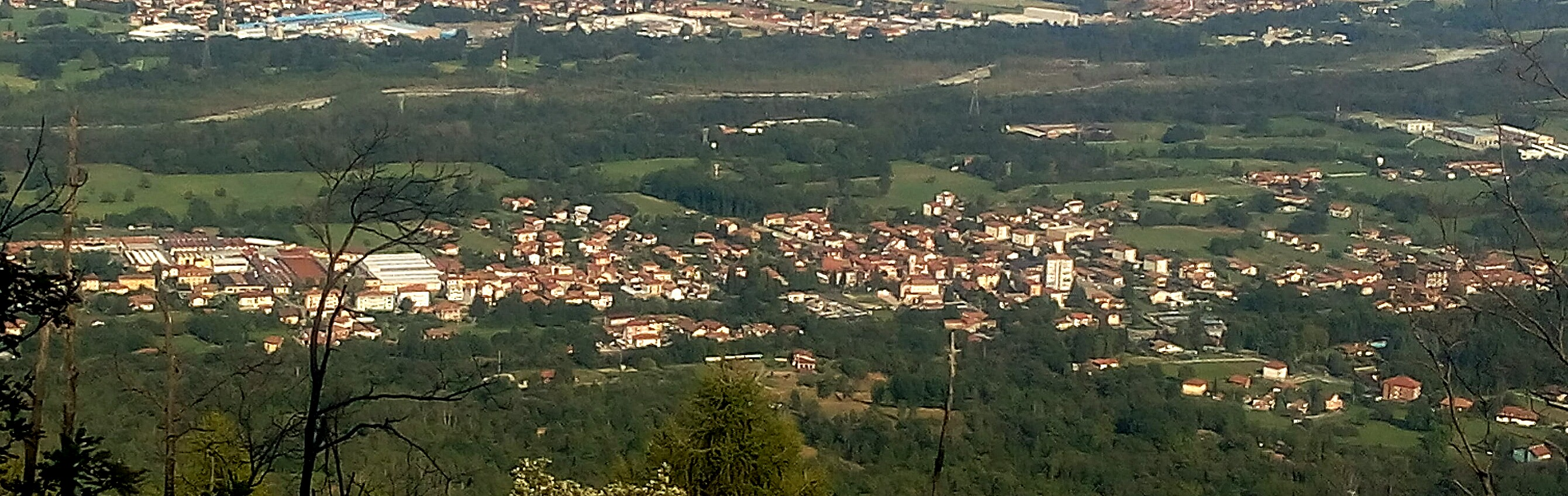

- Coat of arms

- Location within Italy Location within Piedmont
- Coordinates: 45°15′N 7°31′E
- Country: Italy
- Region: Piedmont
- Metropolitan city: Turin (TO)
- Frazioni: Monasterolo

Government
  - Mayor: Daniele Marietta

Area
  - Total: 10.23 km^{2} (3.95 sq mi)
- Elevation: 408 m (1,339 ft)

Population (30 November 2017)
  - Total: 3,420
  - Density: 334/km^{2} (866/sq mi)
- Demonym: Cafassesi
- Time zone: UTC+1 (CET)
  - Summer (DST): UTC+2 (CEST)
- Postal code: 10070
- Dialing code: 0123
- Patron saint: St. Gratus
- Saint day: 7 September
- Website: Official website

Cafasse is a comune (municipality) in the Metropolitan City of Turin in the Italian region Piedmont, located at the mouth of the Valli di Lanzo about 25 kilometres (16 mi) northwest of Turin.
