= Adriaan Dortsman =

17th-century Dutch architect

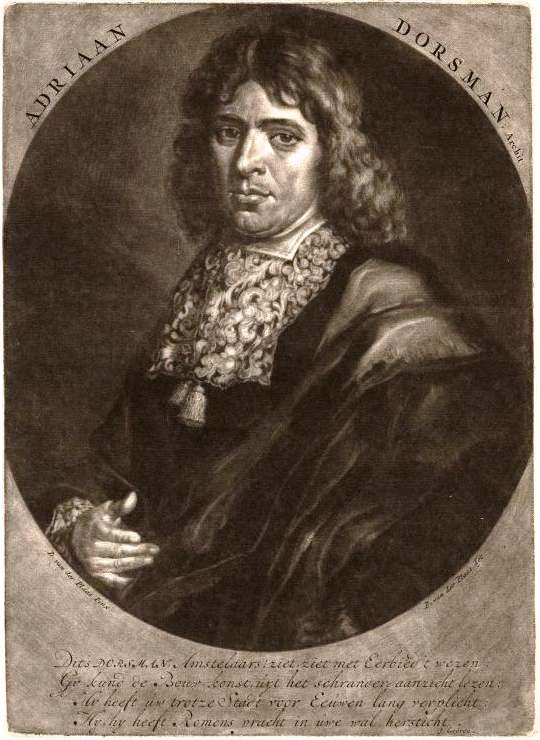
Portrait of Dortsman by David van der Plas

Adriaan Dortsman (1635, Vlissingen – 1682, Amsterdam) was a Dutch Golden Age architect of Amsterdam.

== Biography ==
According to the RKD he moved to Amsterdam in 1667 and is known for drawings and architectural designs. He designed the Ronde Lutherse Kerk (Amsterdam), (part of) the Oosterkerk, the Wallonian orphanage (today Maison Descartes), the "Van Raey" houses for the wealthy grain and weapons merchant Jeremias van Raey on the Keizersgracht (today one half of this complex is home to the Museum Van Loon), Amstel 216 (for the soap manufacturer Gijsbert Dommer, which was later purchased by mayor Coenraad van Beuningen), and Gunterstein. In 1676 he designed a new set of fortifications for Naarden, for William III of England.

Dortsman became quite wealthy and left the bulk of his estate to his housekeeper Cornelia van der Gon, who married his assistant, the painter David van der Plas after he died. Cornelia van der Gon was a dollhouse decorator, and both Dortsman and Van der Plas assisted her. The two dollhouses of Cornelia van der Gon later came into the hands of Sara Rothé, and parts of the original dollhouses, including interior designs by Dortsman and paintings by Van der Plas can still be seen. One dollhouse is in the Frans Hals Museum, and the other dollhouse is in the Gemeentemuseum Den Haag.

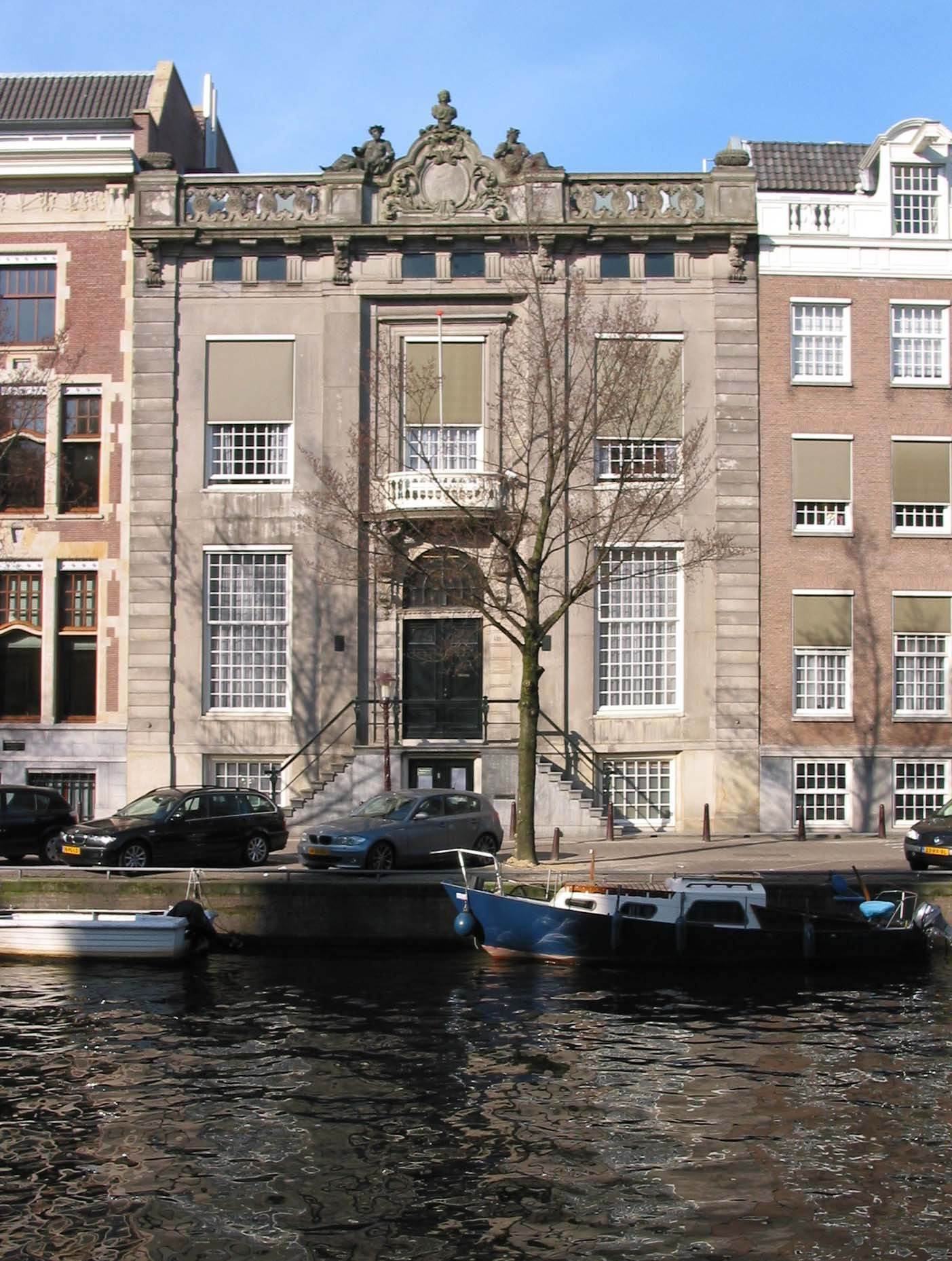
Herengracht 539, Amsterdam

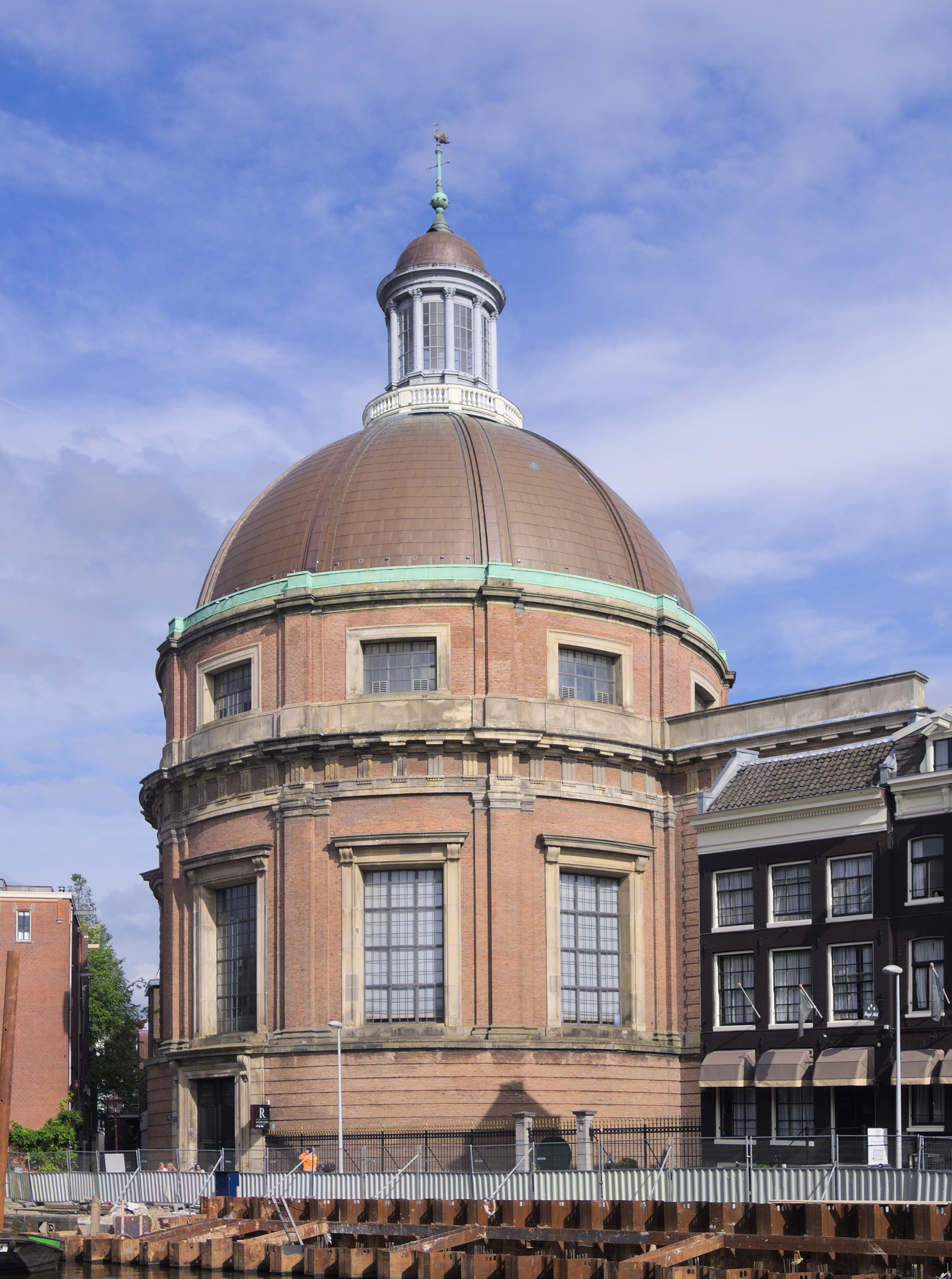
Ronde Lutherse Kerk

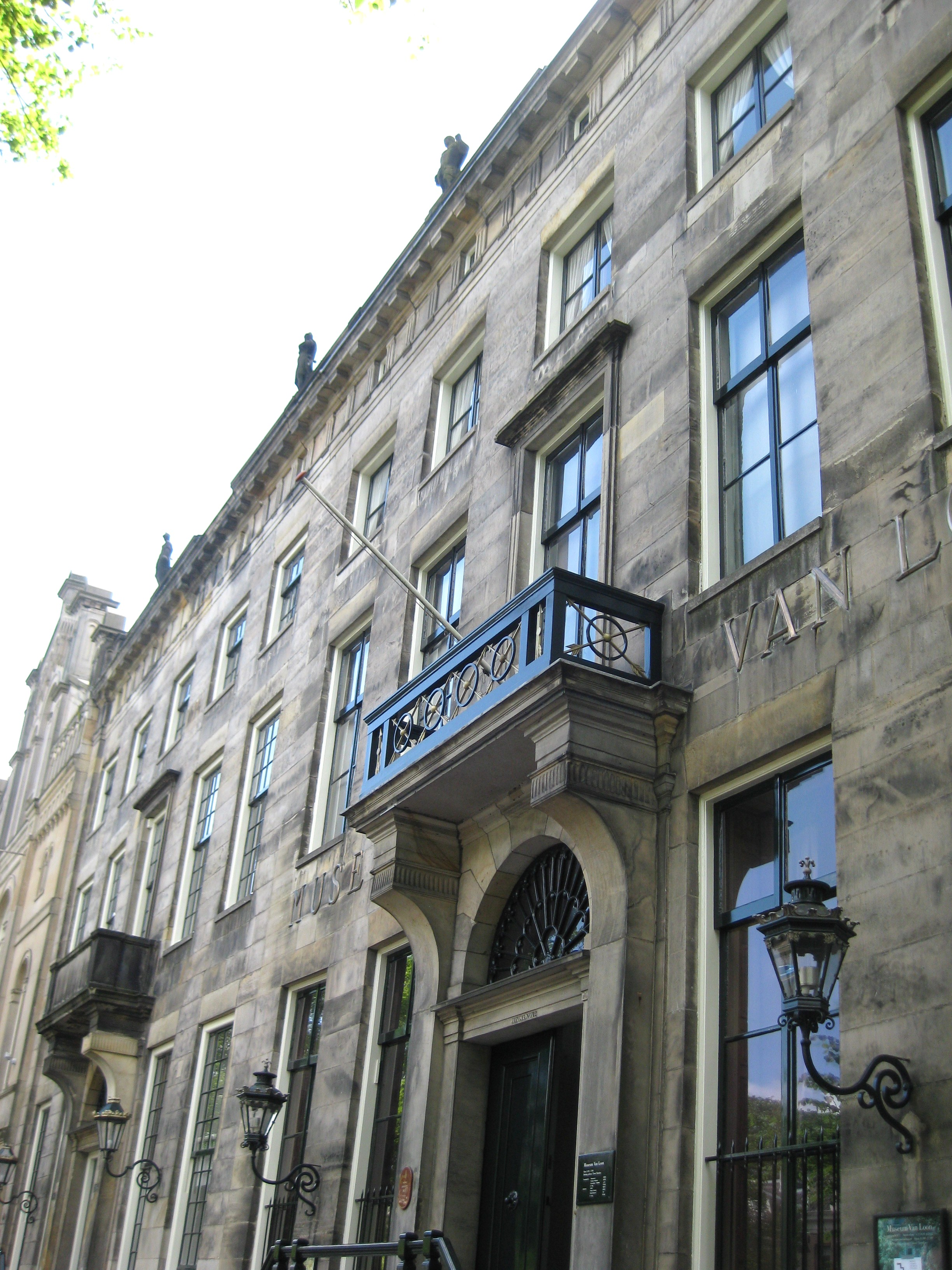
Museum Van Loon

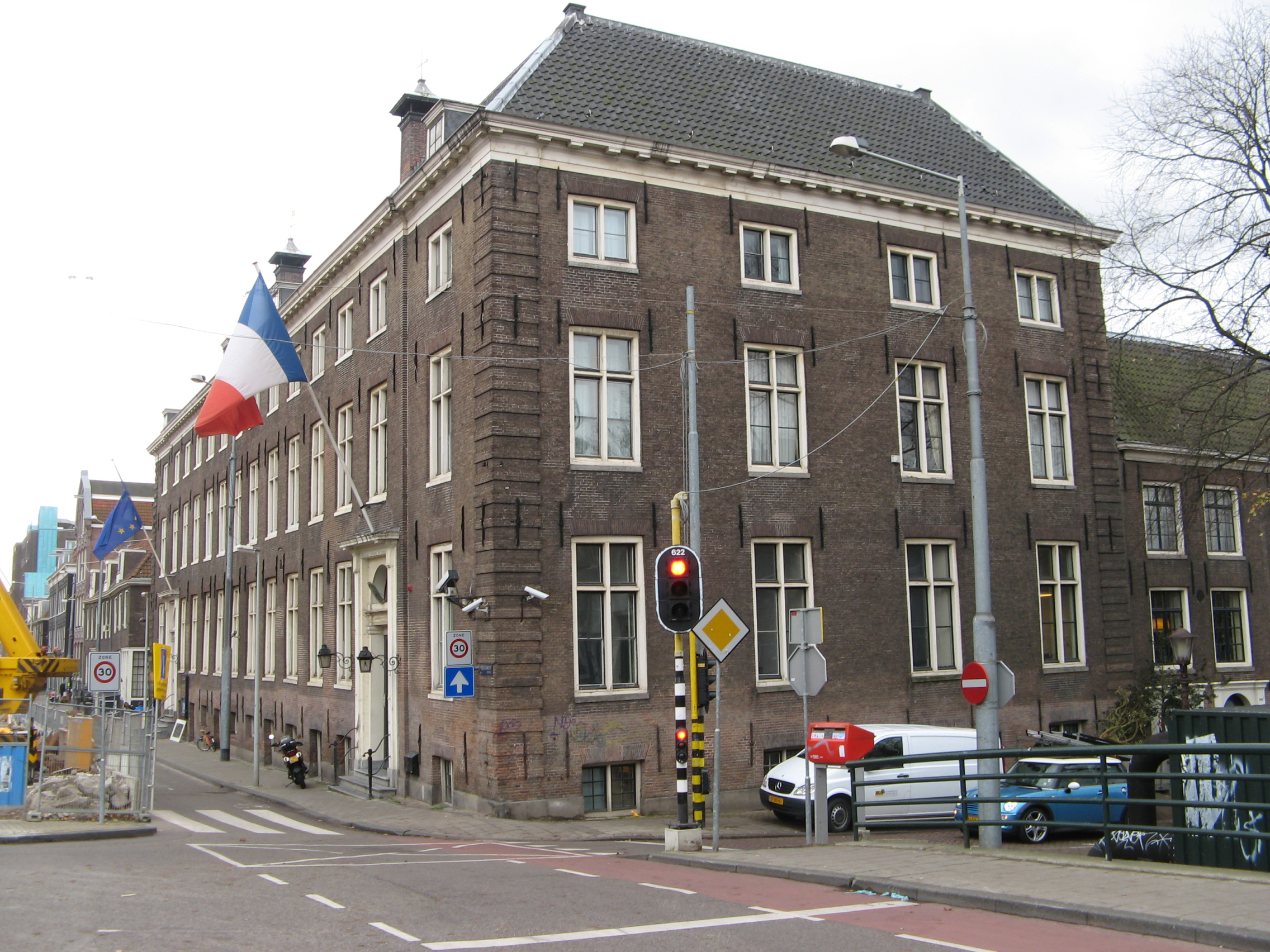
Vijzelgracht 2A, Maison Descartes

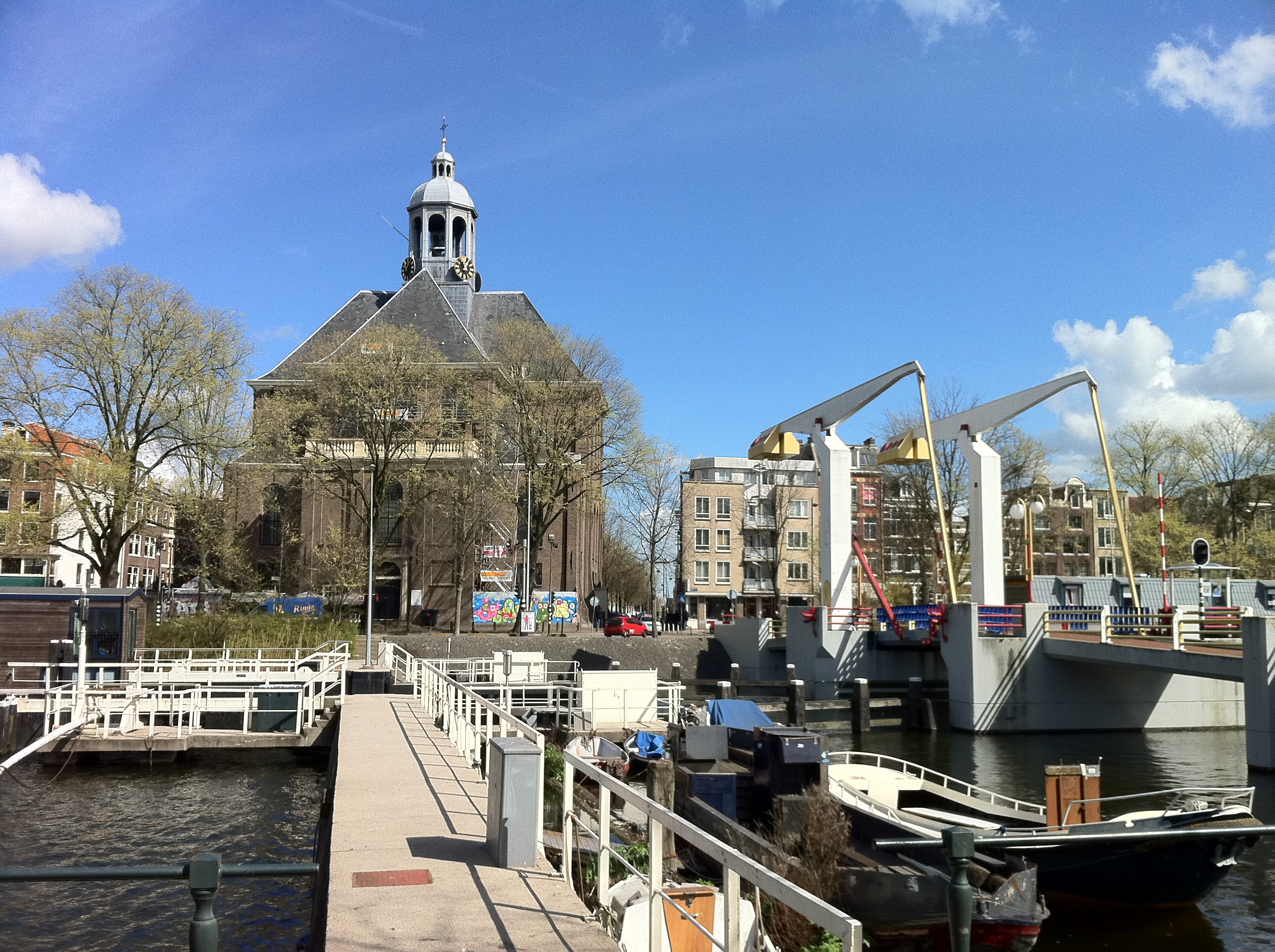
Oosterkerk, on the Nieuwe Vaart

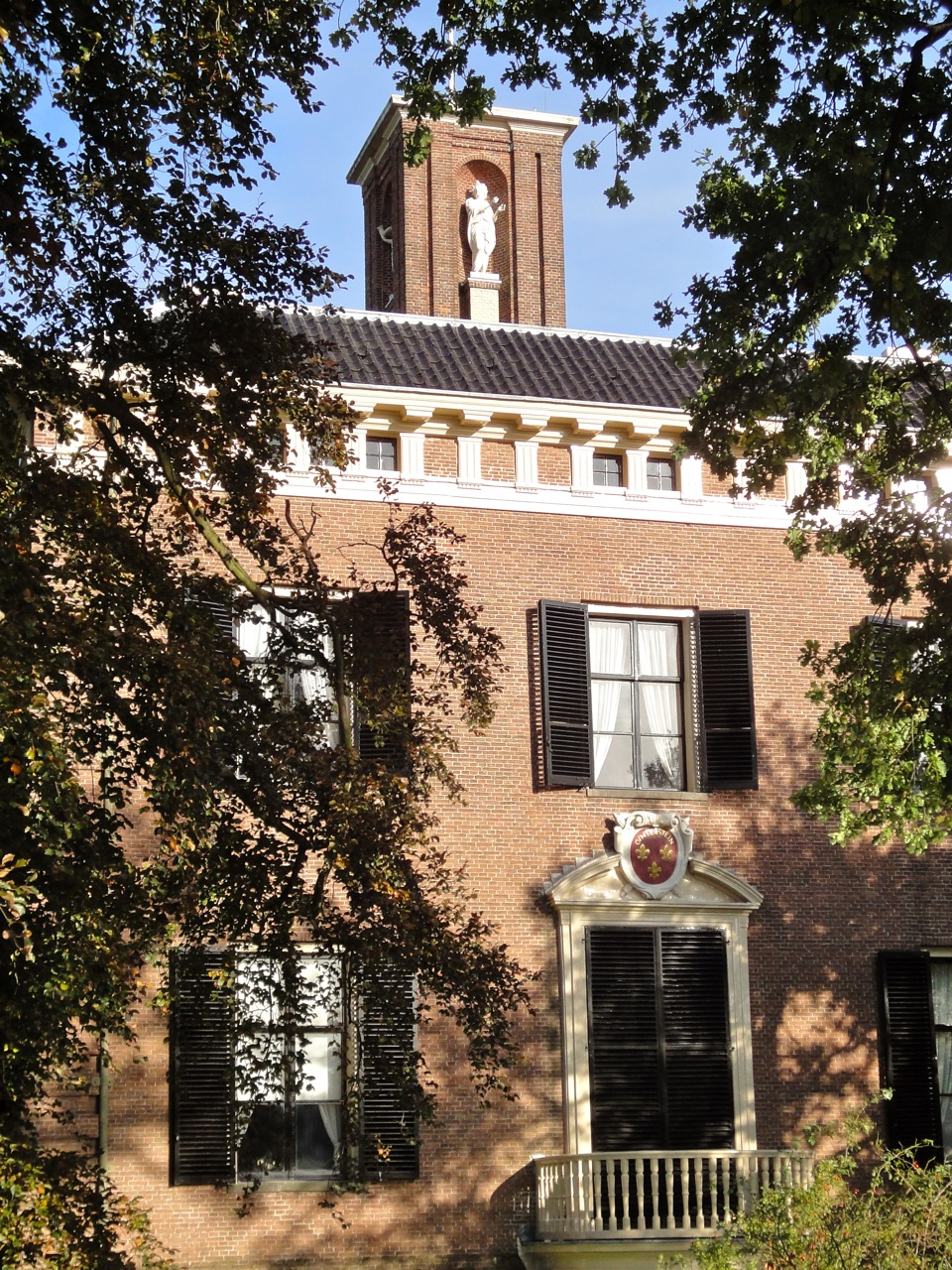
Gunterstein

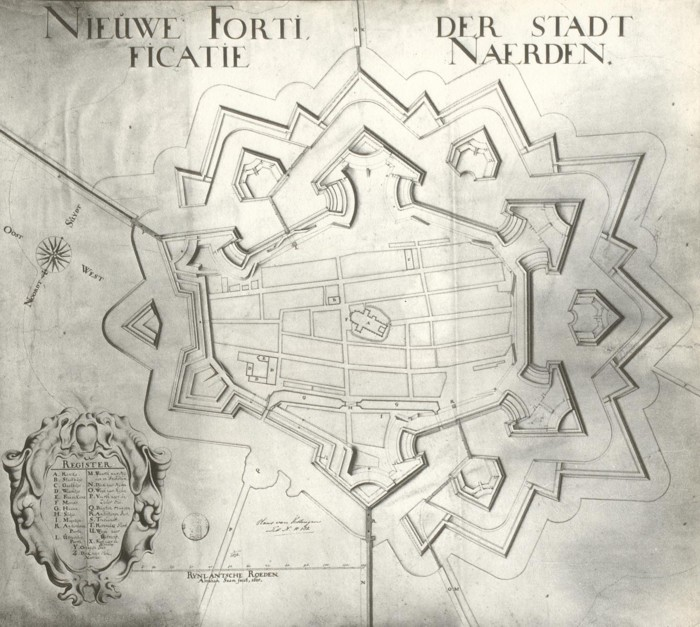
New fortifications for the city of Naarden (today mostly intact)
