= Marekerk =

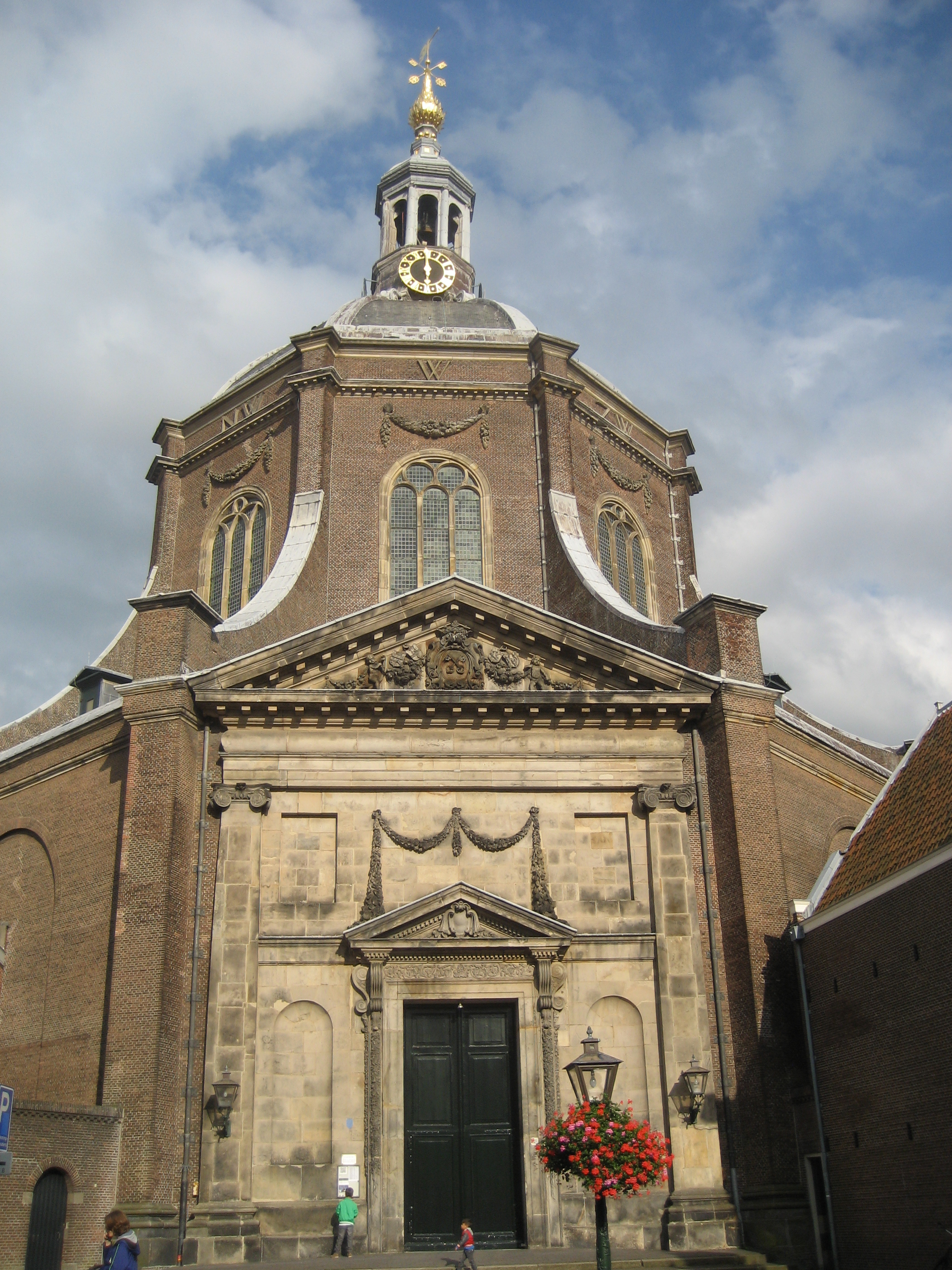
- View of entrance on the Lange Mare.
- Marekerk
- 52°9′43″N 4°29′26″E
- Location: Lange Mare, Leiden
- Country: Netherlands
- Denomination: Netherlands Protestant (PKN)

History
- Founded: 1639

Architecture
- Architect: Arent van 's-Gravesande
- Style: Dutch Baroque
- Years built: 1649

Administration
- Parish: Leiden (North side to Marewijk)

The Marekerk is a Protestant church in Leiden, located at the Lange Mare and the Oude Vest canal. The church can be easily seen from the Oude Vest and the Burcht van Leiden by its round dome.

== History ==
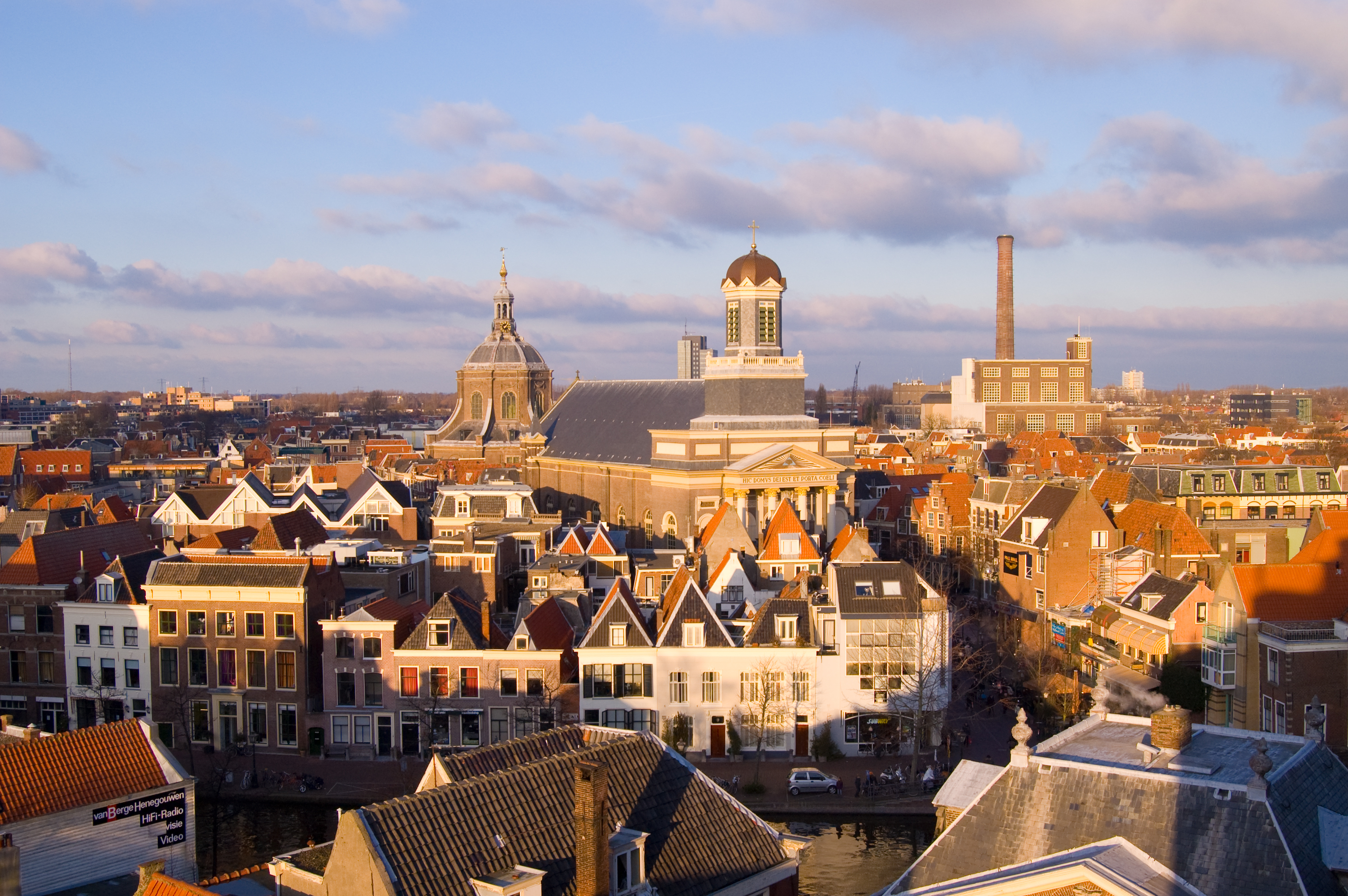
View of Leiden towards the North. The Marekerk was the tallest building on the horizon, until the Catholic church Hartebrugkerk (center) was built with a taller tower in 1836.

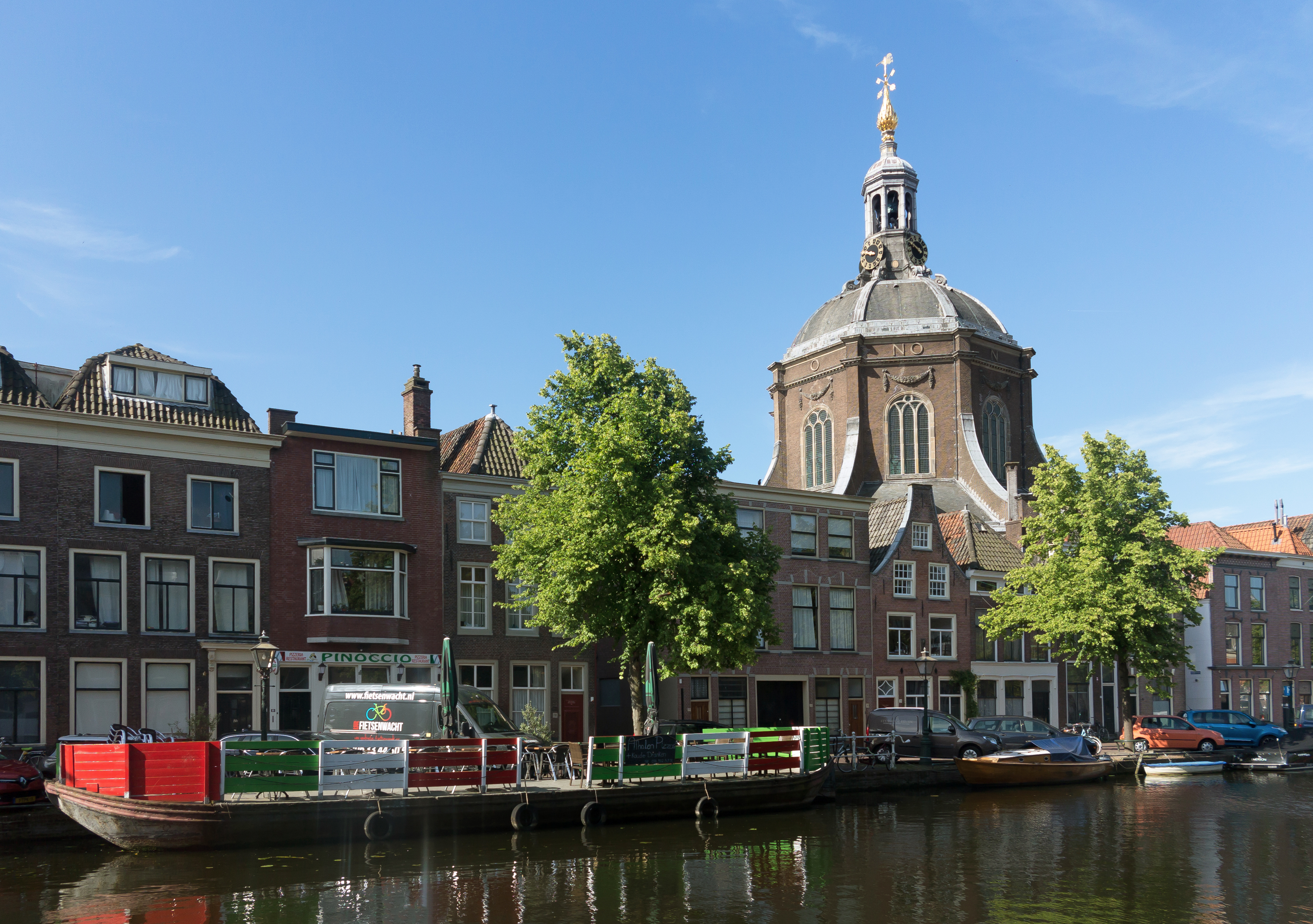
Church (de Marekerk) with boat in the canal

The church was designed by the city architect Arent van 's-Gravesande in 1639–1649, who also designed the Bibliotheca Thysiana on Rapenburg 25. It was one of the first churches in the Netherlands designed specifically for Protestant church services. It was opened in 1649. The main entrance was designed by Jacob van Campen in 1659. The organ was built by Pieter de Swart around 1560 for the choir of the Pieterskerk and it was moved to the Marekerk in 1733 and enlarged by Rudolph Garrels. It was restored in 1966 by Flentrop Orgelbouw.

The carillon has a church bell by C. Wegewaert from 1647, with a diameter of 202.7 cm and it has a bell by Francois Hemony from 1663 with a diameter of 98.6 cm. The mechanical clock in the tower is by B. Eijsbouts in 1941, an electric winding mechanism was added later.

Services are held on Sunday at 10:00 a.m. and 5:00 p.m. The church is open to visitors during Saturday afternoons in July and August and occasionally on Saturday afternoons throughout the year.

== See also ==
- 17th-century Western domes

Other 17th century "round" churches of the Netherlands:

- Ronde Lutherse Kerk, round church of Amsterdam
- Oostkerk, round church of Middelburg
