= Museum Van Loon =

Amsterdam museum on Keizersgracht 672, residence of members of the Van Loon family

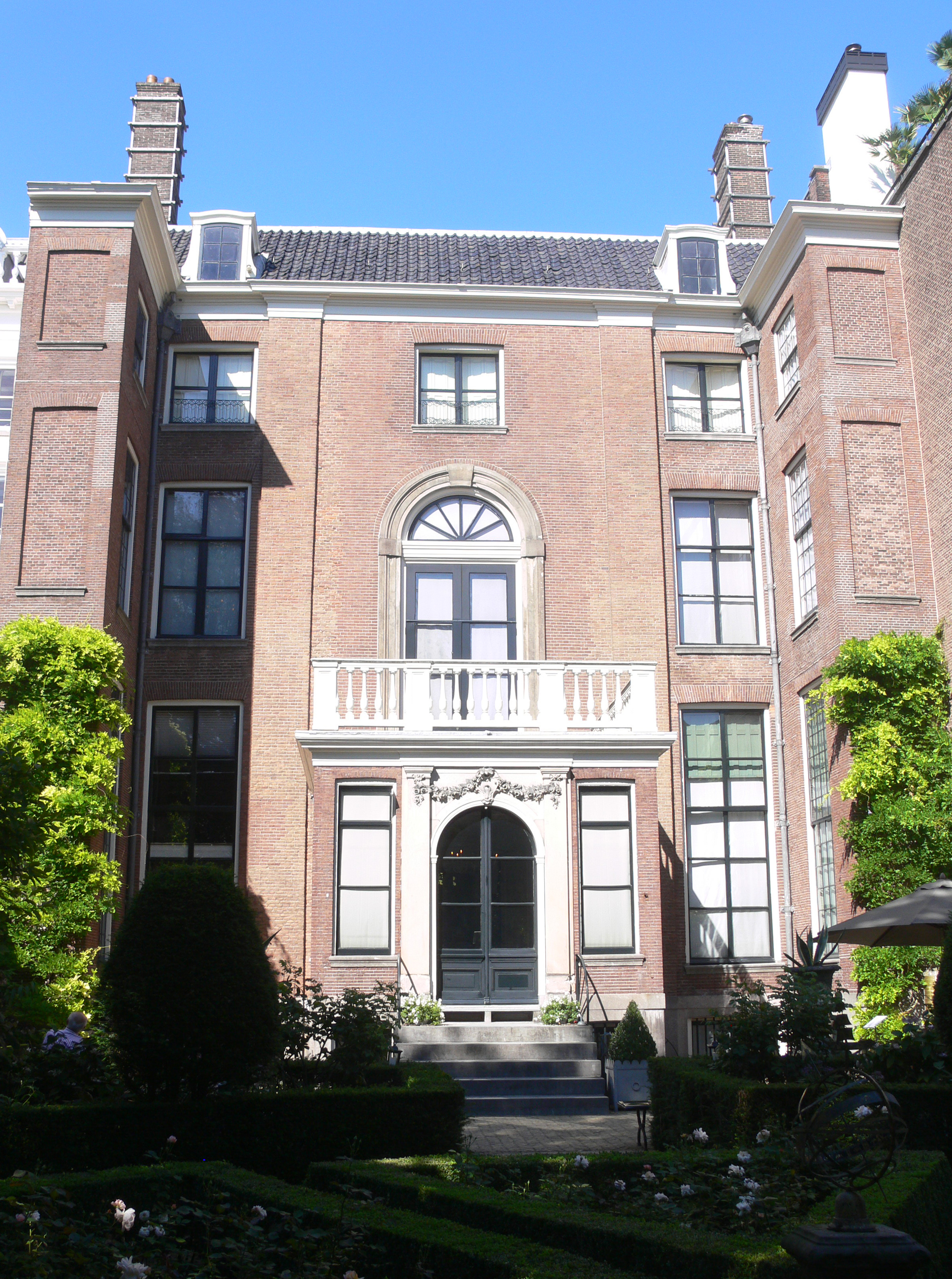
- The museum as seen from the garden

- Location in Amsterdam
- Established: 1973 (museum)
- Location: Keizersgracht 672; Amsterdam, Netherlands
- Coordinates: 52°21′48″N 4°53′34″E
- Architect: Adriaan Dortsman
- Website: www.museumvanloon.nl

Museum Van Loon is a museum located in a canalside house alongside the Keizersgracht in Amsterdam, Netherlands. The museum is named after the family Van Loon that lived in the house from the 19th century.

== History ==
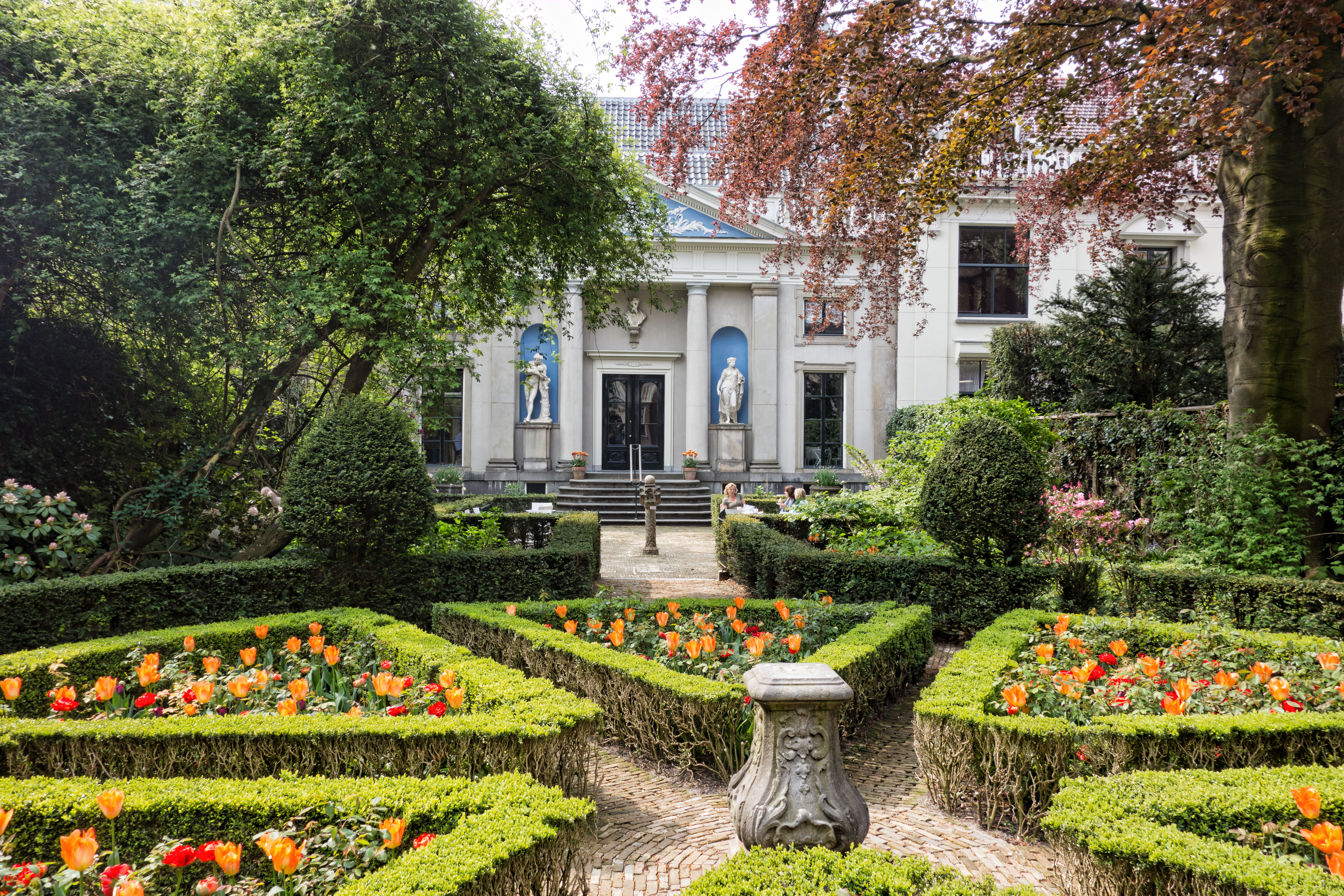
Van Loon Gardens

The canal house where the museum resides was built in 1672, and served as the home of artist Ferdinand Bol. From 1884 to 1945 the Van Loons lived in the house. Thora van Loon-Egidius, who lived in the house, was a lady-in-waiting for Wilhelmina of the Netherlands.

== Architecture and collection ==
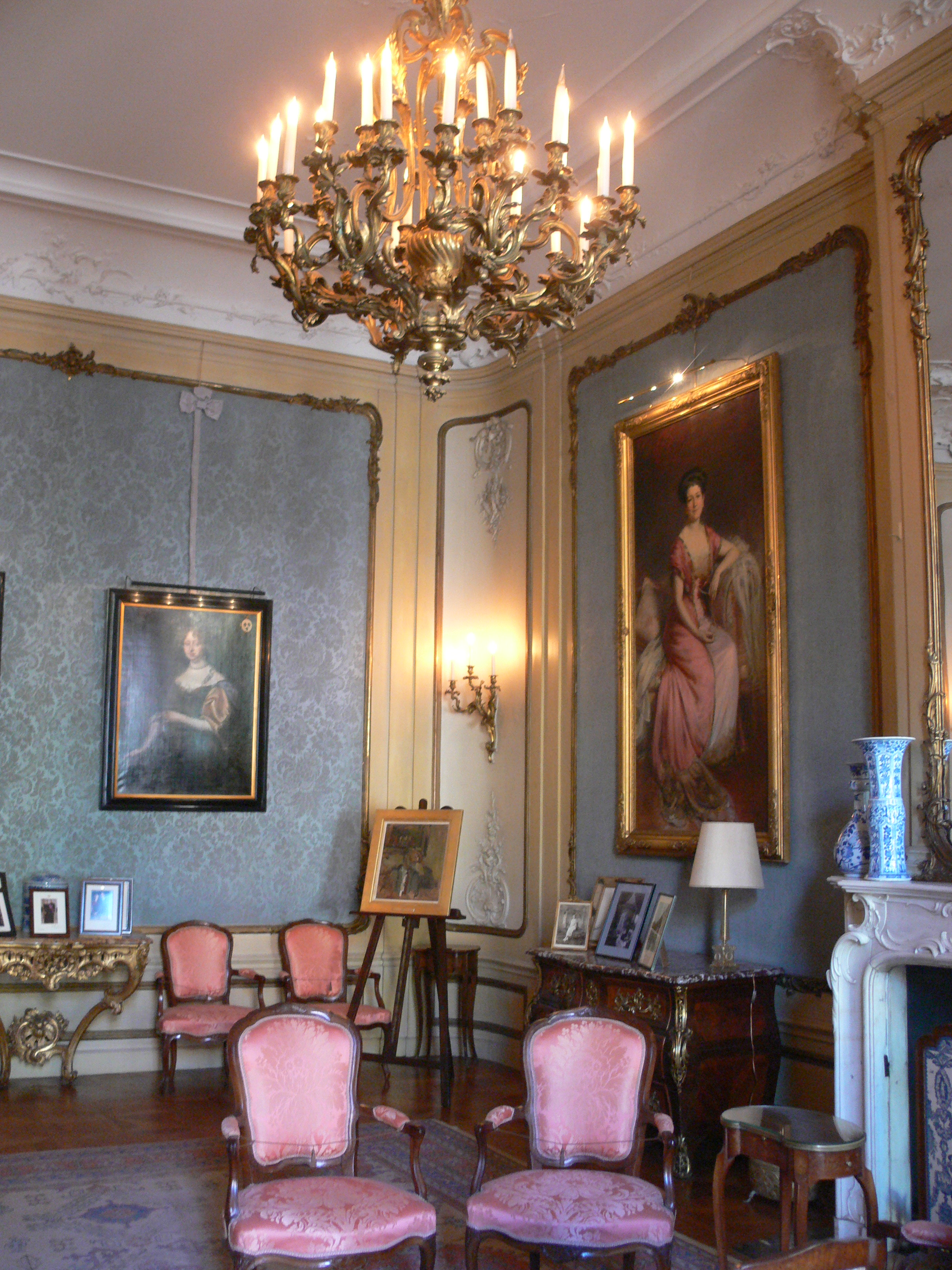

The house was designed in 1672 by Adriaan Dortsman, the famous Dutch architect known for having created the Ronde Lutherse Kerk. There are four sculptures on top of the house, representing Ceres, Mars, Minerva and Vulcan. The interior of the house has been renovated, and appears reminiscent of its look in the 18th-century, with wood paneling and stucco work. The upstairs features several paintings of Roman sports figures and a bedroom that is decorated with a Romanticism period painting of Italy. The house also has fake bedroom doors: the 18th-century owners desired to have symmetry in the interior design so they painted the real bedroom doors to match the walls and fake doors to appear real in a location where one would assume a door would be.
