= Thora van Loon-Egidius =

Dutch dame du palais (1865–1945)

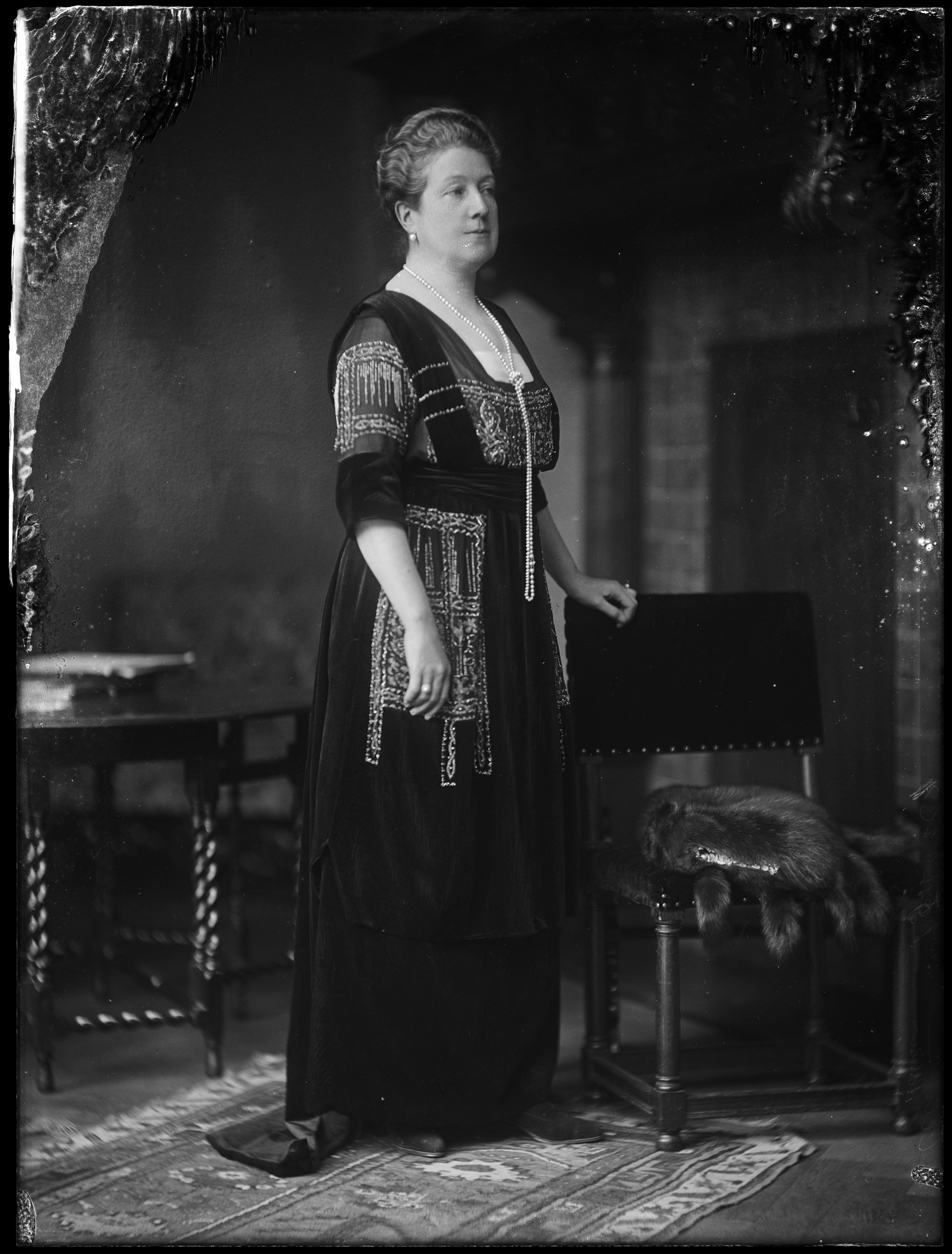
- Van Loon-Egidius in 1914
- Born: Thora Nanna van Loon; 15 March 1865; Amsterdam, Netherlands
- Died: 6 December 1945 (aged 80); Amsterdam, Netherlands
- Resting place: Nieuwe Oosterbegraafplaats
- Occupation: Dame du palais of Queen Wilhelmina
- Years active: 1897–1945
- Spouse: Willem Henrik van Loon
- Parents: Thorvald Frederik Egidius; Cornelia Clasina Gildemeester

Thora Nanna van Loon-Egidius (15 March 1865 – 6 December 1945) was a Dutch dame du palais, comparable to a lady-in-waiting, of Queen Wilhelmina.

== Biography ==
Thora Egidius was a daughter of Thorvald Frederik Egidius, royal consul general of Sweden and Norway, and Cornelia Clasina Gildemeester. In 1884 she married the banker Willem Hendrik van Loon, a member of the Van Loon family. As a wedding gift, they received the building at Keizersgracht 672 in Amsterdam as a home, which was later converted into Museum Van Loon.

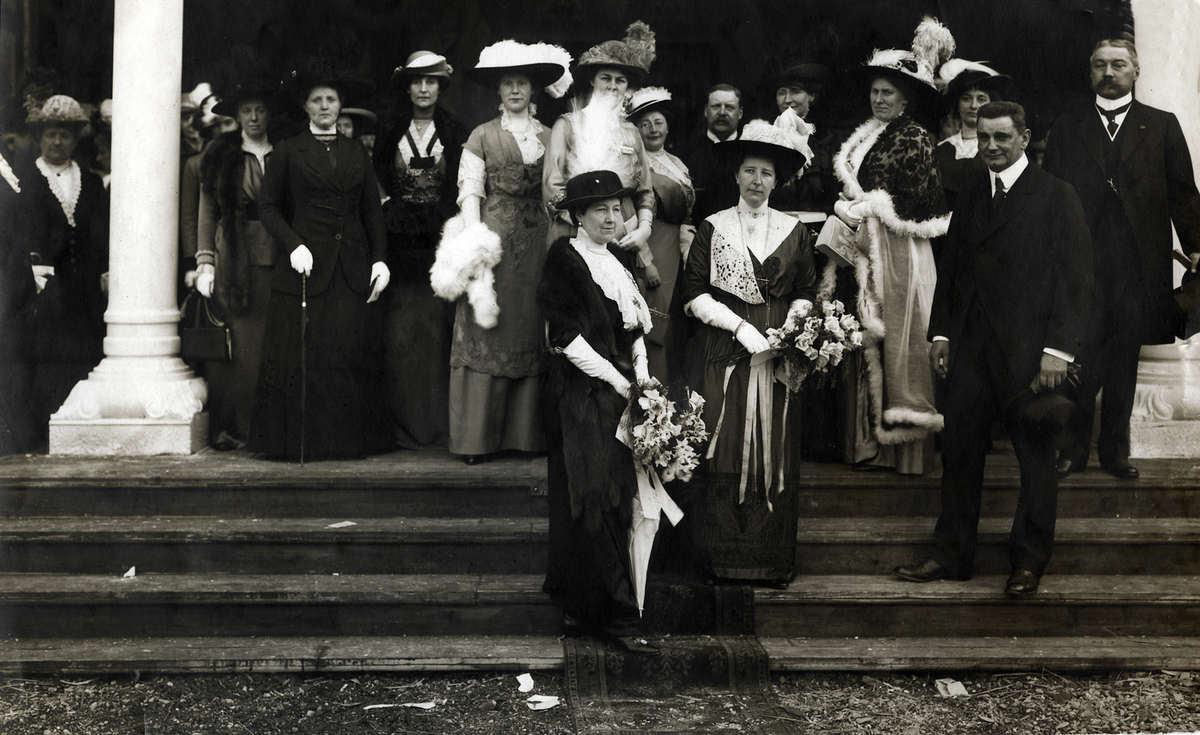
Opening of the exhibition De Vrouw 1813–1913; in the foreground Mrs Van Loon-Egidius (left) and Mia Boissevain (right). Between them Rosa Manus, on the right on the stairs minister Syb Talma and queen's commissioner Wilhelmus Frederik van Leeuwen near the pillar

In early 1897, Queen Regent Emma appointed Thora van Loon-Egidius and Baroness Van Knobelsdorff-van Pallandt as dame du palais for the future Queen Wilhelmina. At that time, this was an unpaid position in the court, with a rank between grandmistress and lady-in-waiting. As dame du palais, she accompanied the Queen during her visits to Amsterdam, she was her representative in Amsterdam and she helped determine who could have an audience with the Queen in the Royal Palace of Amsterdam. She started a diary in the year of the young queen's inauguration, in which she also wrote about her experiences at court and her presence at the queen's wedding in 1901. She represented the queen, among other things, during the opening of the exhibition De Vrouw 1813–1913 and accompanied her when Wilhelmina visited the exhibition a few months later.

Van Loon-Egidius held various board positions. She was, among other things, vice-president of a committee that wanted to offer a gift to the pregnant queen on behalf of the women and girls of Amsterdam. Wilhelmina received the Amsterdamse wieg from them in 1909.

During the Second World War, Queen Wilhelmina stayed in England. She returned to the Netherlands in May 1945. A month later, Van Loon was fired by her, reportedly because of Van Loon's pro-German attitude during the war. Thora van Loon died at the end of that year, at the age of 80. She was buried at the Nieuwe Oosterbegraafplaats in Amsterdam.
