= Sara Rothé =

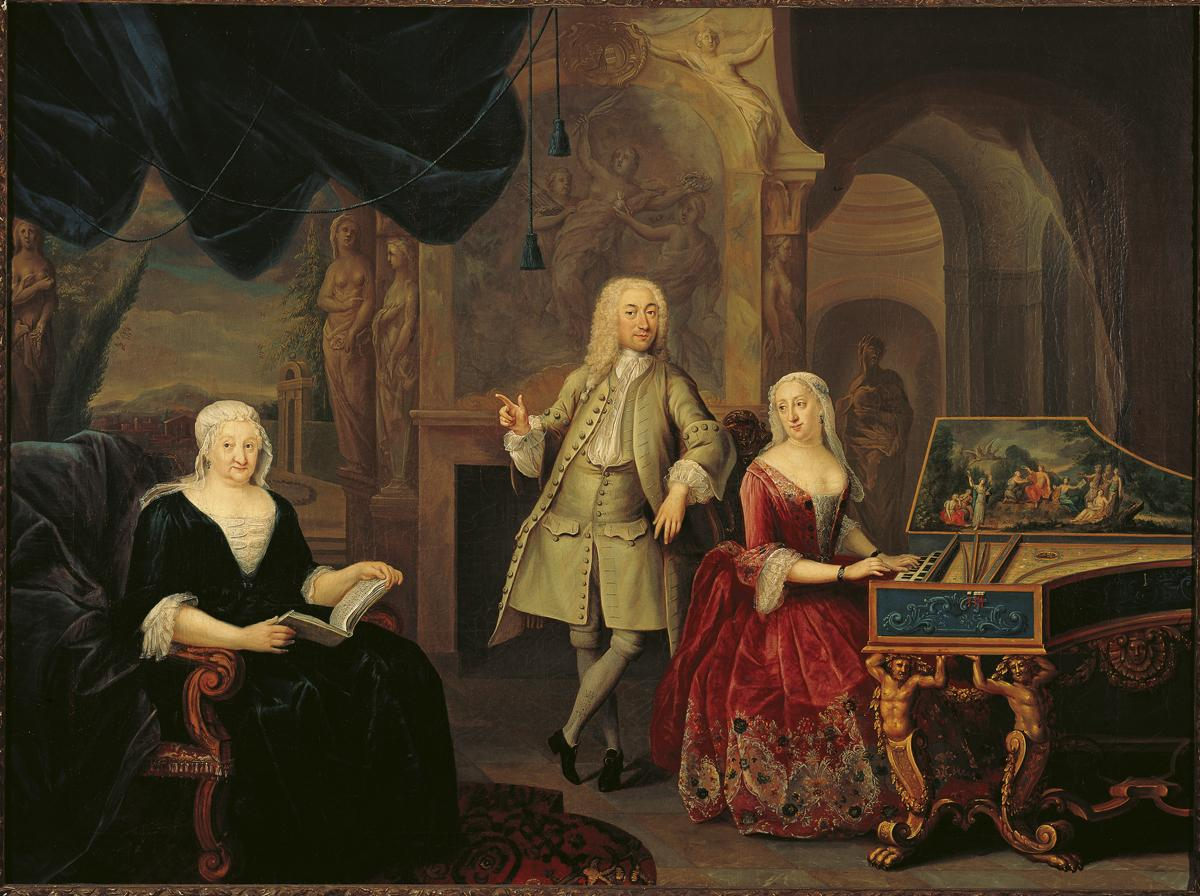
Family Sara Rothé and Jacob Ploos van Amstel with Sara's mother, by Juriaan Buttner, 1735

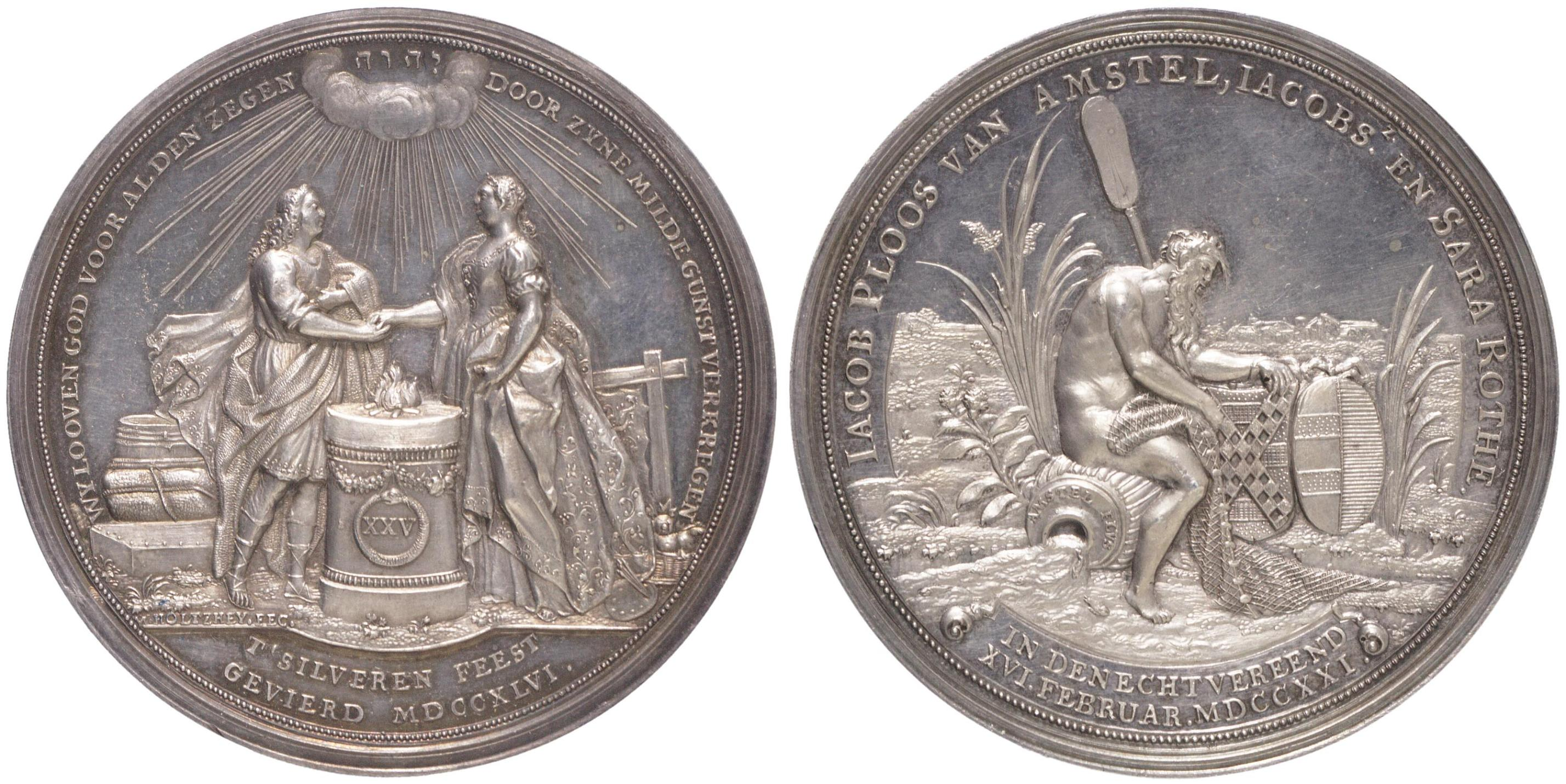
Commemorative medal to celebrate their 25th wedding anniversary in 1746, by Martin Holtzhey, from the collection of the Amsterdam Museum.

Sara Rothé (1699–1751) was an 18th-century art collector from the Dutch Republic, known today as the former owner of two dollhouses now on display in the Frans Hals Museum and the Gemeentemuseum Den Haag.

== Biography ==
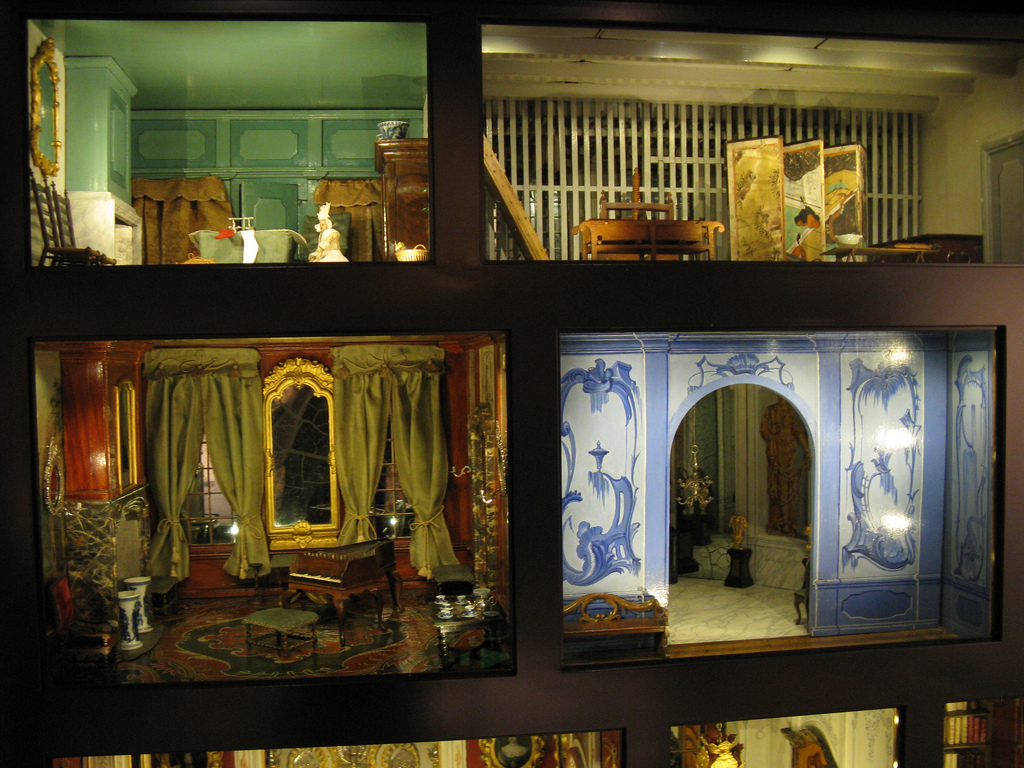
Dollhouse (detail) on display in the Frans Hals Museum

Sara Rothé was born in Amsterdam as the only surviving child and heir to the clerk Christoffel Rothé (1674-1725) and Sara (van) Ludick (1666-1738). She married the rich merchant Jacobus Ploos van Amstel (1695-1760) 16 February 1721 in Amsterdam. Her marriage was childless.

In the early 18th century, Amsterdam's canal houses were home to a multitude of curiosity cabinets, and one type that was often kept by women, was the "miniature house", a dollhouse based on the owner's own house in real life, and which often included miniature books, art objects, and furniture items from chamber pots to garden fountains. Such dollhouses were meant for show rather than play, and visitors from all over the Netherlands and beyond would come to Amsterdam to visit such "cabinets". Sara Rothé was a dollhouse owner who spent most of her time on decorating and showing her cabinet. She was herself a very good embroiderer and embroidered most of the cloth furnishings in the cabinet. According to a book produced by the museum, she kept two dollhouses, which she was constantly improving, and a large improvement was achieved when she bought three dollhouses for 1,000 guilders, which were advertised for auction on April 2, 1743, in the Amsterdamse Courant. Two of these had been the dollhouses of Cornelia van der Gon, the wealthy widow of Adriaan Dortsman who later married the artist David van der Plas. It was Van der Plas who painted many dollhouse decorations for his wife and others. Today part of the dollhouse and some of the furnishings can be traced back to Cornelia van der Gon.

== Two dollhouses for two homes ==
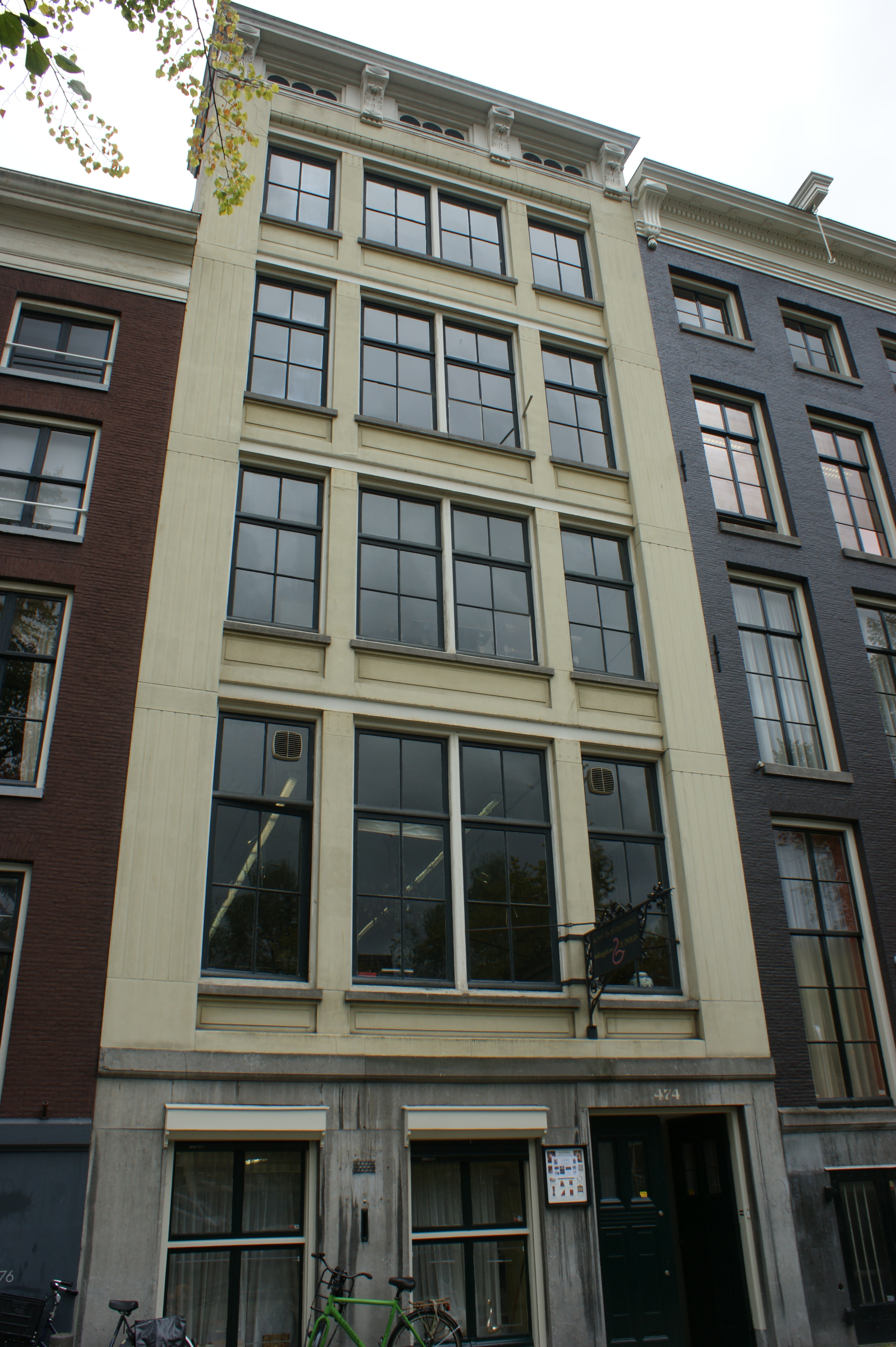
Keizersgracht 474 today, former home of Sara and Jacob in Amsterdam

The houses in miniature that Sara Rothé created were probably based on her house in Amsterdam, Keizersgracht 474, and her summer home or "buitenplaats" called "Klein Berkenrode" which was located on what is today the Rijksstraatweg in Haarlem. Sara Rothé died in an accident when her coach fell into the Haarlemmertrekvaart near Halfweg when she was travelling from her summer home in Haarlem to Halfweg to pick up her husband who left the city to join her there. Though she, her husband, and two visitors were with her in the coach at the time, and two trekschuits came quickly to the rescue, she drowned because it was too difficult to pull her out.

Though Sara and her husband were not considered members of the top elite, they were quite wealthy, as evidenced from the fact that their home in Haarlem was sold in 1761 to Albertus Hodshon, the father of the wealthy Cornelia Hodson, who later built the building housing the Koninklijke Hollandsche Maatschappij der Wetenschappen today.

== See also ==
- The other dollhouse that belonged to Sara Rothé is kept in the Gemeentemuseum Den Haag
- The Rijksmuseum has three dollhouses, including one assembled by Petronella Oortman, who like Sara, lived in Amsterdam on the Warmoesstraat
