= Cornelia van der Gon =

Dutch art collector

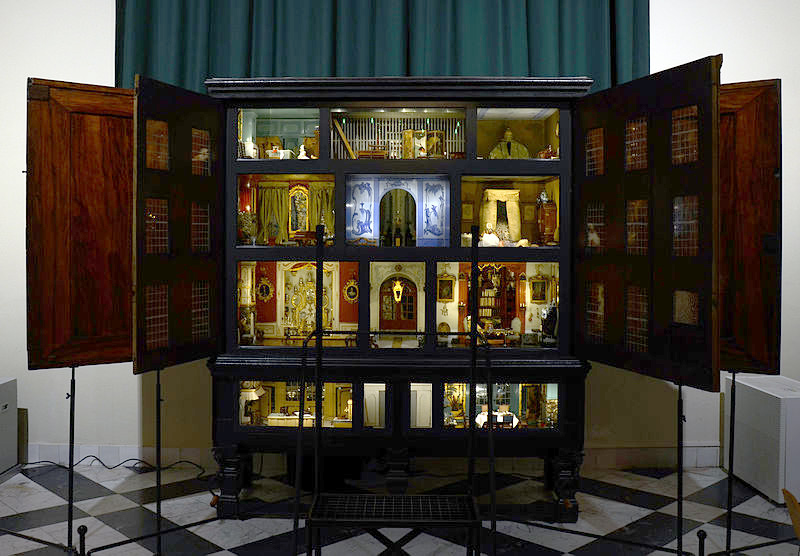
Dollhouse Frans Hals Museum

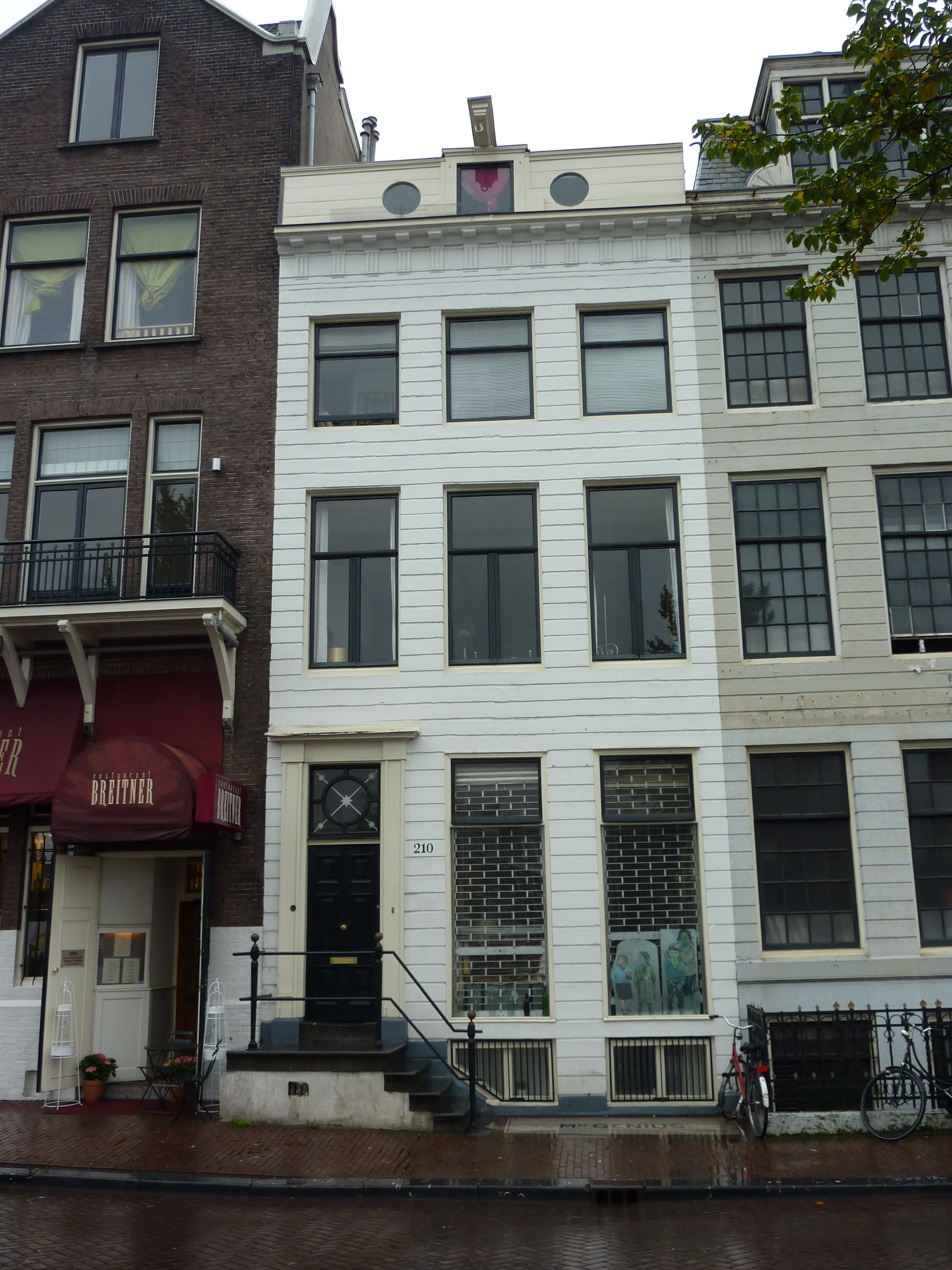
Amstel 210, her home

Cornelia van der Gon (1644 – 1701) was an owner of a show-dollhouse that attracted a following in Amsterdam in the 17th century.

She was born in Haarlem as the daughter of the kastelein of the Stadsdoelen (today the Stadsbibliotheek Haarlem). After her father died in 1667 she moved to Amsterdam, where she became the housekeeper of the Amsterdam architect Adriaan Dortsman and started creating dollhouses in his house in 1680. After he died in 1682 he left her most of his estate, including four houses, of which she kept one to live in on Amstel 210. She married Dorsman's assistant, the artist David van der Plas in 1684 who came to live in her house. He helped her with decorations for the doll houses, as did the landscape painter Jan Wijnants.

Two of her dollhouses were purchased by Sara Rothé when she bought three dollhouses for 1,000 guilders that were advertised for auction on April 2, 1743, in the Amsterdamse Courant. Though Rothé dismantled Van der Gon's dollhouses to create her own, the doll house in the Frans Hals Museum still contains many original details added by Van der Gon.

She died in Amsterdam.
