= David van der Plas =

Dutch Golden Age portrait painter

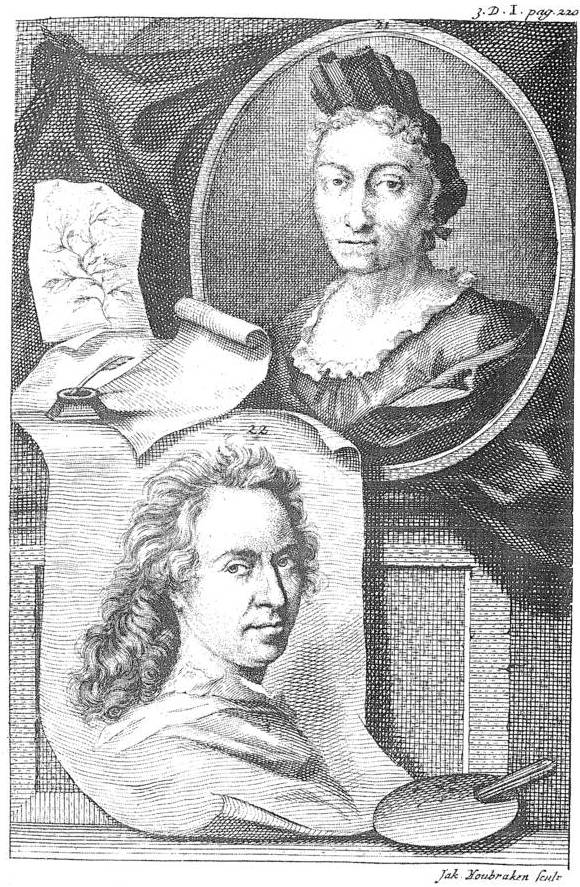
- David van der Plas and Maria Sybille Merian in Arnold Houbraken's Schouwburg.
- Born: 11 December 1647; Amsterdam
- Died: 18 May 1704 (aged 56); Amsterdam
- Known for: Painting
- Movement: Dutch Golden Age painting

David van der Plas (11 December 1647 – 18 May 1704) was a Dutch Golden Age portrait painter.

== Biography ==
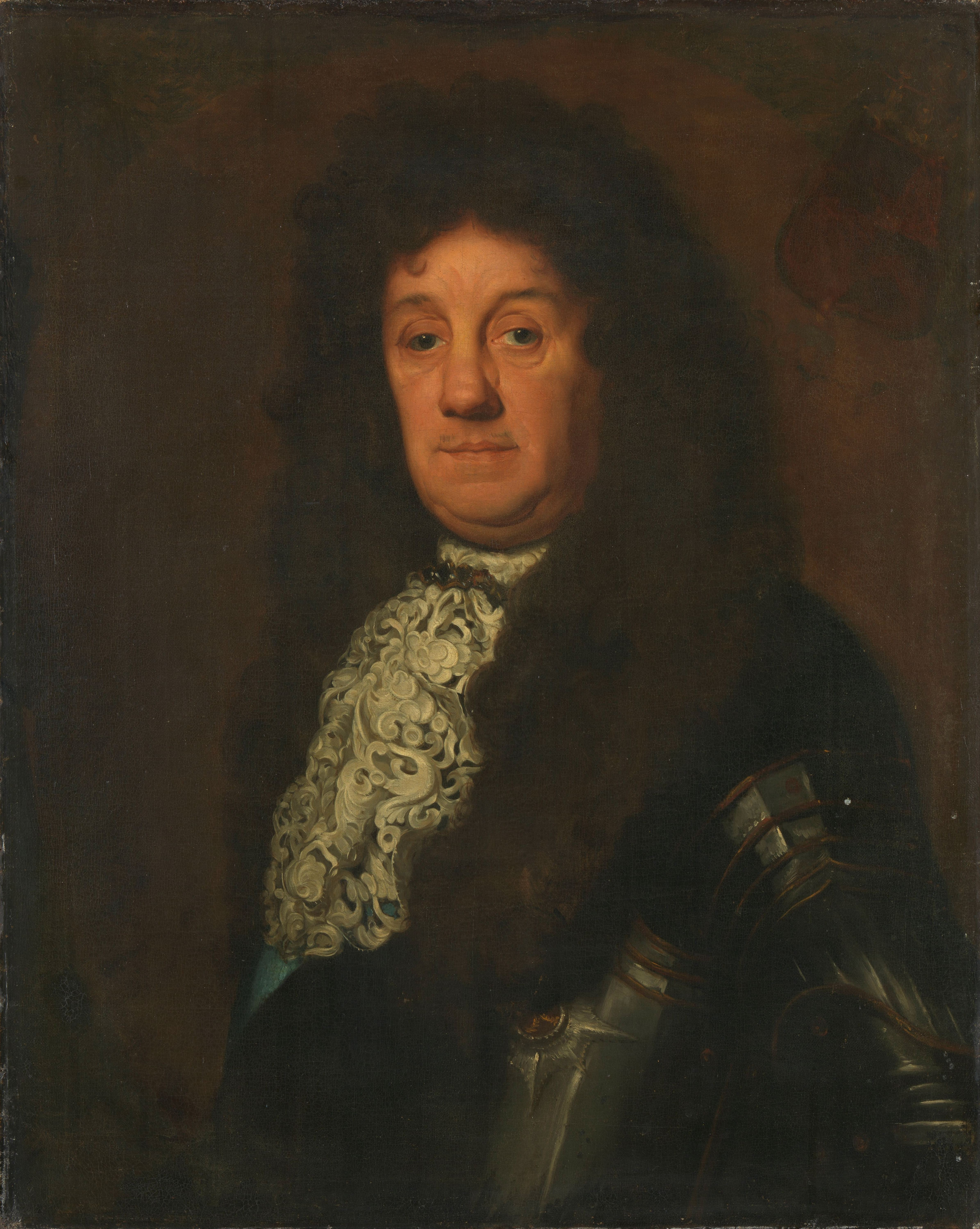
Van der Plas' portrait of Cornelis Tromp

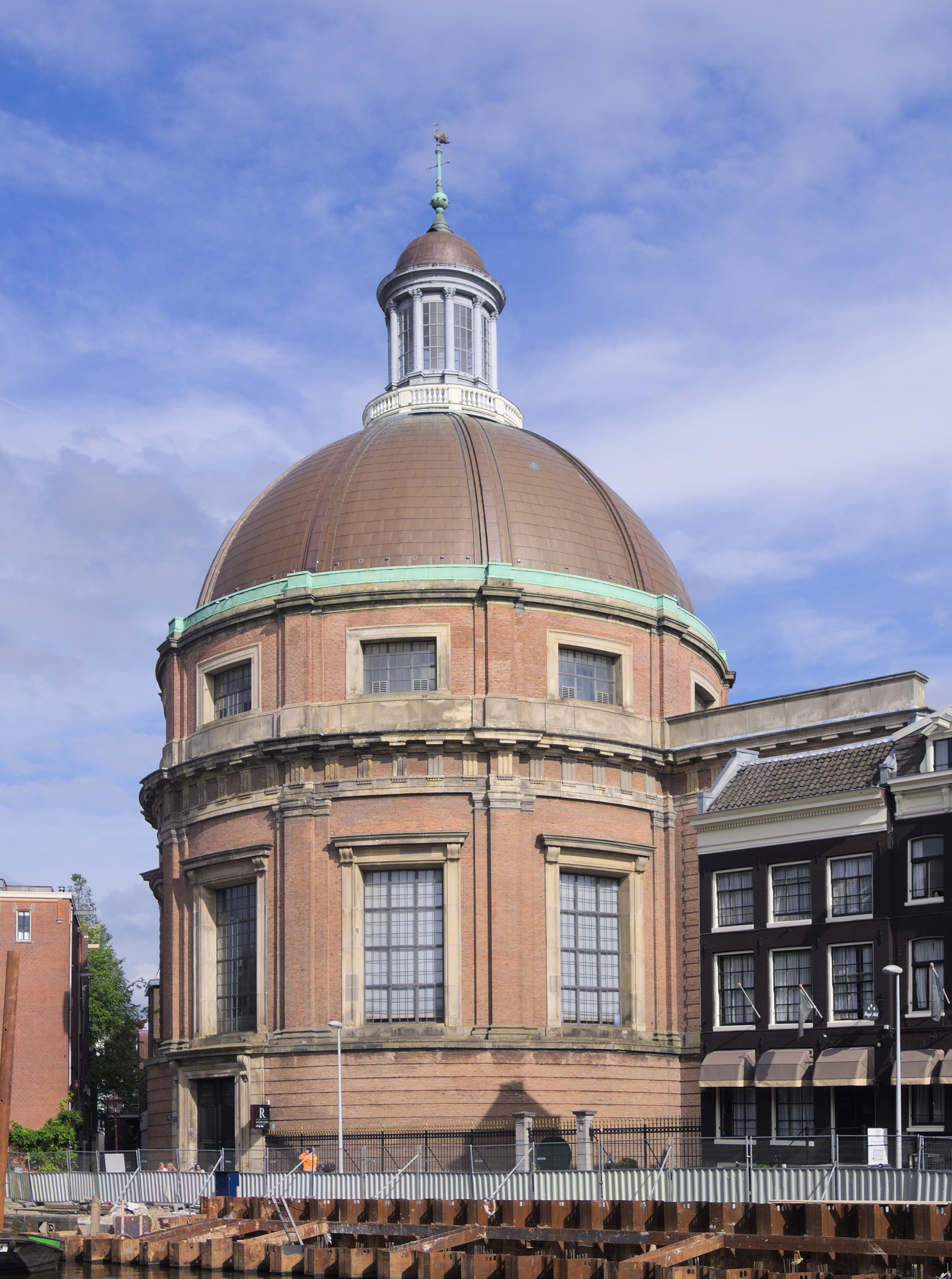
Dortsman's Round Lutheran church in Amsterdam

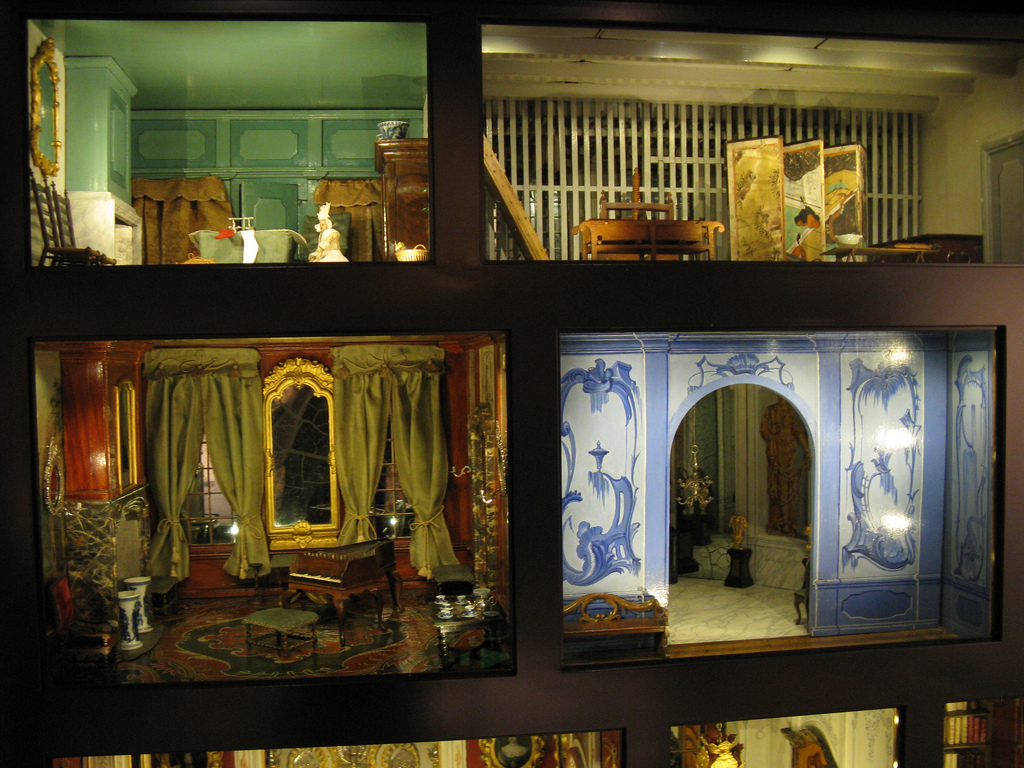
Doll house in the Frans Hals Museum

David van der Plas became famous as a portrait painter, and his most illustrious patron was Cornelis Tromp. In 1684 he married Cornelia van der Gon of Haarlem, the daughter of the castellan (kastelein) of the Oude Doelen, the meeting quarters of the Haarlem schutterij (the building currently houses the Stadsbibliotheek Haarlem). David van der Plas' brother-in-law was the painter Govert van der Leeuw and his pupil was Jacob Appel.

His wife Cornelia van der Gon was the rich heiress of the Amsterdam architect Adriaan Dortsman (ca. 1636–1682), who designed the round Lutheran church on the Singel. The marriage was childless, and Cornelia spent her time on her doll houses, which Dortsman had helped design and which Van der Plas helped decorate. The landscape painter Jan Wijnants also painted miniatures for these doll houses. Cornelia died in 1701, and after the death of Van der Plas, the doll houses were sold at auction to Sara Rothé, who used them to decorate her own doll houses. One of these doll houses can be seen in the Gemeentemuseum Den Haag, and the other one can be seen in the Frans Hals Museum.
