= Dutch Baroque architecture =

Baroque architecture in the Dutch Republic

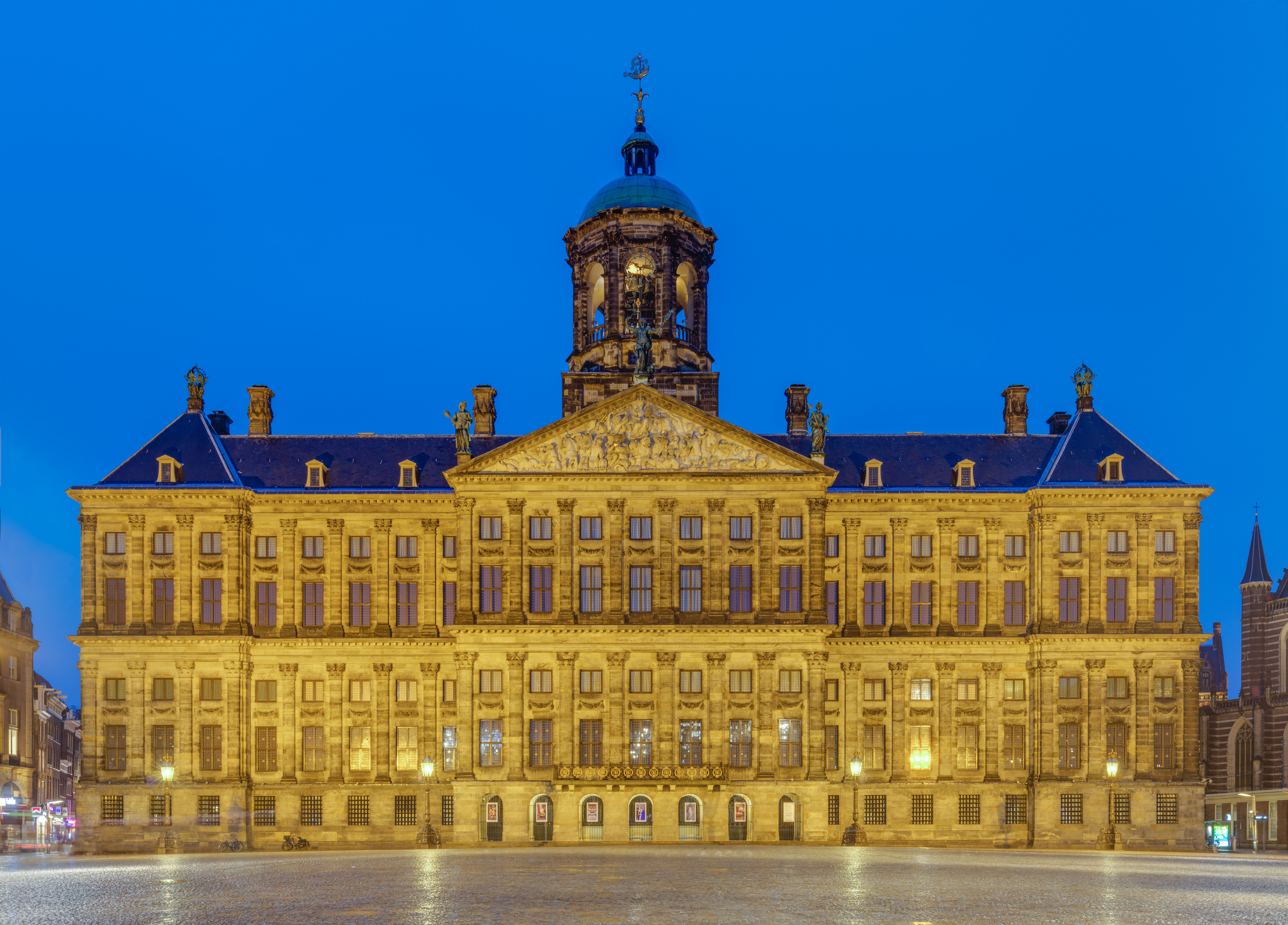
Royal Palace of Amsterdam: Jacob van Campen, 1646.

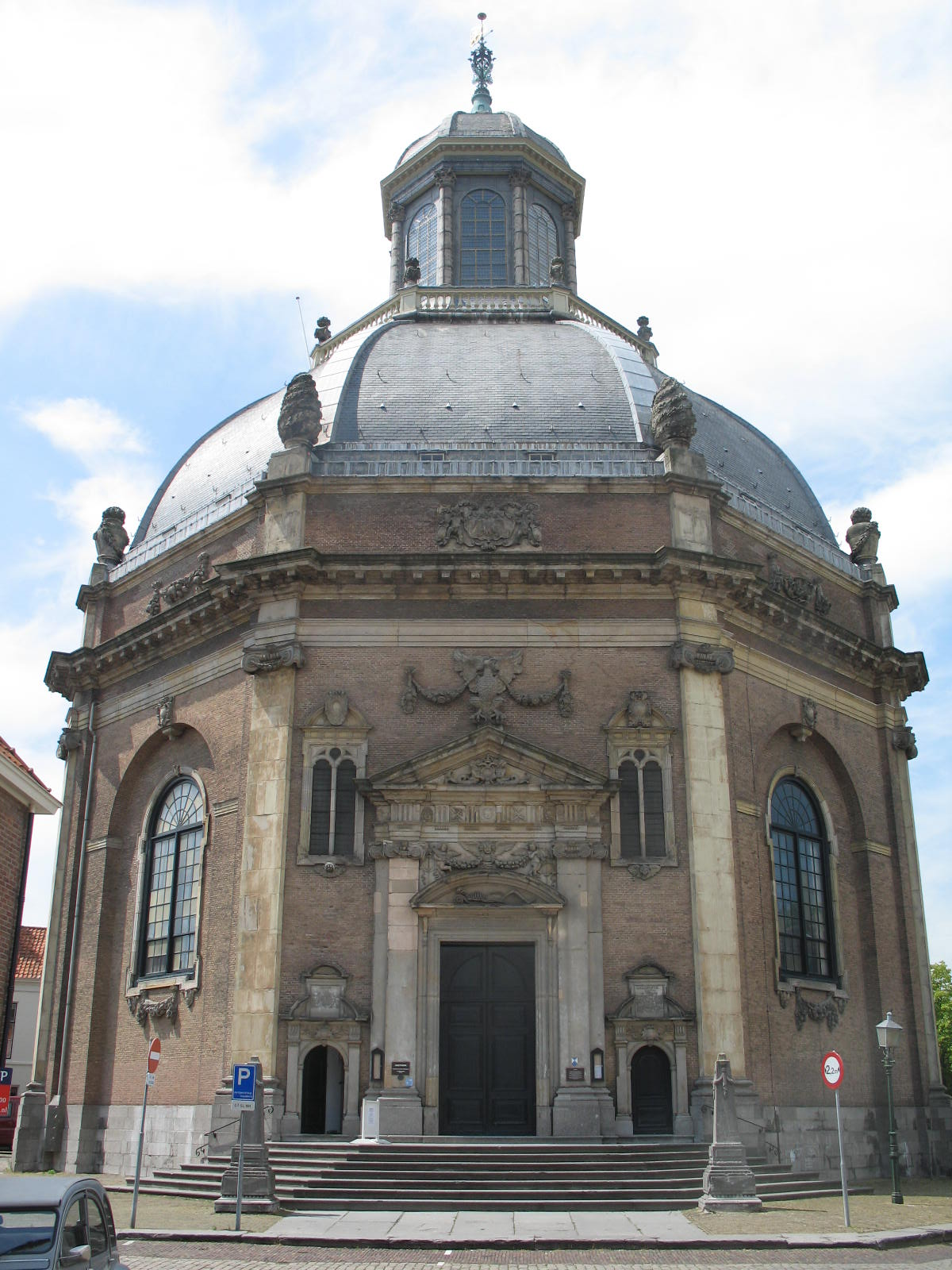
Oostkerk, Middelburg: Arent van 's-Gravesande, 1667.

Dutch Baroque architecture is a variety of Baroque architecture that flourished in the Dutch Republic and its colonies during the Dutch Golden Age of the 17th century. (Dutch painting during the period is covered by Dutch Golden Age painting).

Like contemporary developments in England, Dutch Palladianism is marked by sobriety and restraint. The architecture of the first republic in Northern Europe was meant to reflect democratic values by quoting extensively from classical antiquity. It found its impetus in the designs of Hendrick de Keyser, who was instrumental in establishing a Venetian-influenced style into early 17th-century architecture through new buildings like the Noorderkerk ("Northern church", 1620–1623) and Westerkerk ("Western church", 1620–1631) in Amsterdam. In general, architecture in the Low Countries, both in the Counter-Reformation-influenced south and Protestant-dominated north, remained strongly invested in northern Italian Renaissance and Mannerist forms that predated the Roman High Baroque style of Borromini and Bernini. Instead, the more austere form practiced in the Dutch Republic was well suited to major building patterns: palaces for the House of Orange and new civic buildings, uninfluenced by the Counter-Reformation style that made some headway in Antwerp.

The major exponents of the mid-17th century, Jacob van Campen and Pieter Post, adopted de Keyser's forms for such eclectic elements as giant order pilasters, gable roofs, central pediments, and vigorous steeples. Brought together in a coherent combination, these stylistic developments anticipated Christopher Wren's Classicism. The most ambitious constructions of the period included the seats of self-government in Amsterdam (1646) and Maastricht (1658), designed by Campen and Post, respectively. On the other hand, the residences of the House of Orange are closer to a typical burgher mansion than to a royal palace. Two of these, Huis ten Bosch and Mauritshuis, are symmetrical blocks with large windows, stripped of ostentatious Baroque flourishes. The same austerely geometrical effect is achieved without great cost or pretentious effects at the stadtholder's summer residence of Het Loo.

The Dutch Republic was one of the great powers of 17th-century Europe and its influence on European architecture was significant. Dutch architects were employed on important projects in Northern Germany, Scandinavia and Russia, disseminating their ideas in those countries. The Dutch Colonial architecture, once flourishing in the Hudson River Valley and associated primarily with red-brick gabled houses, may still be seen in Willemstad, Curaçao, although painted with more varied colors.

== Gallery ==
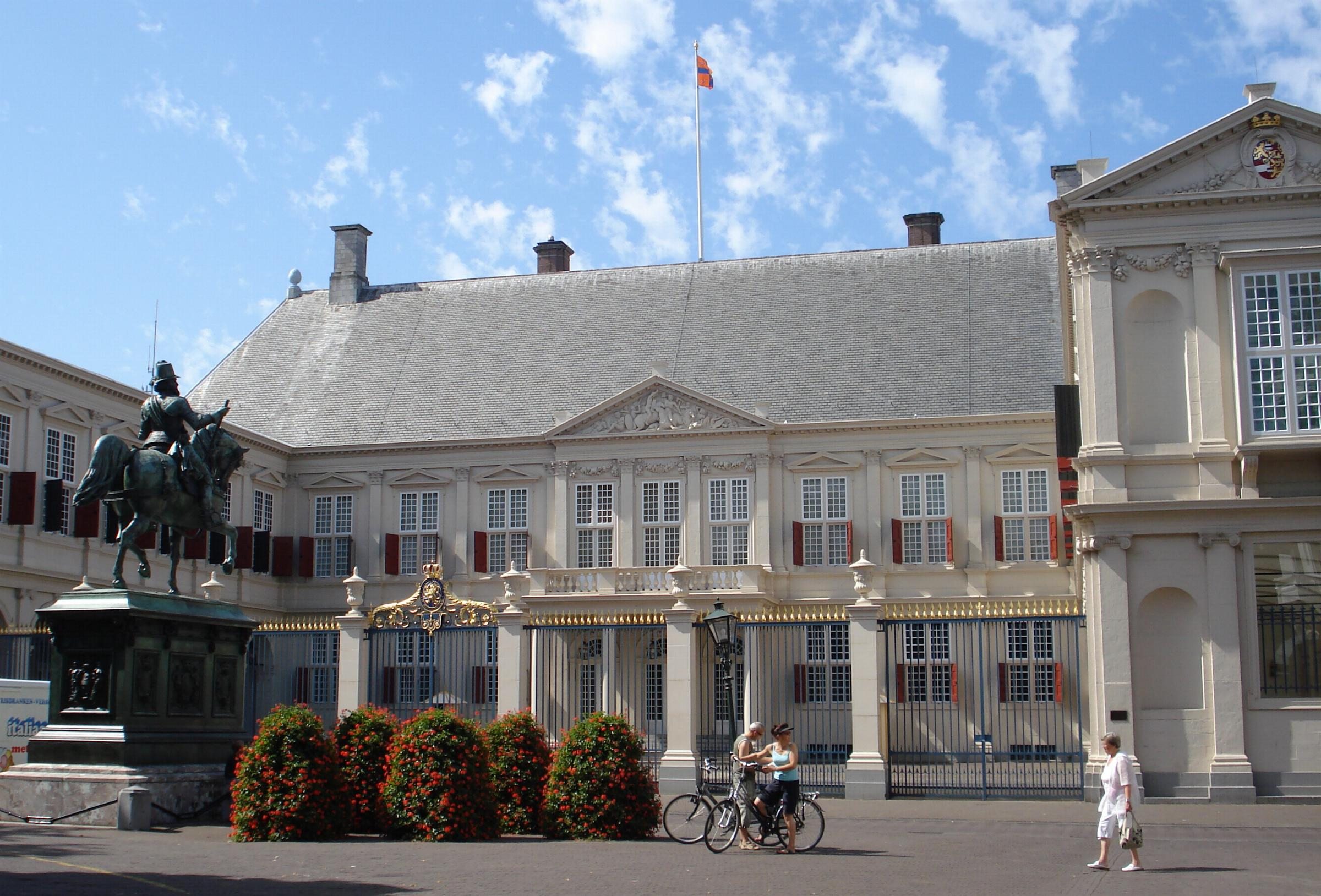
Noordeinde Palace

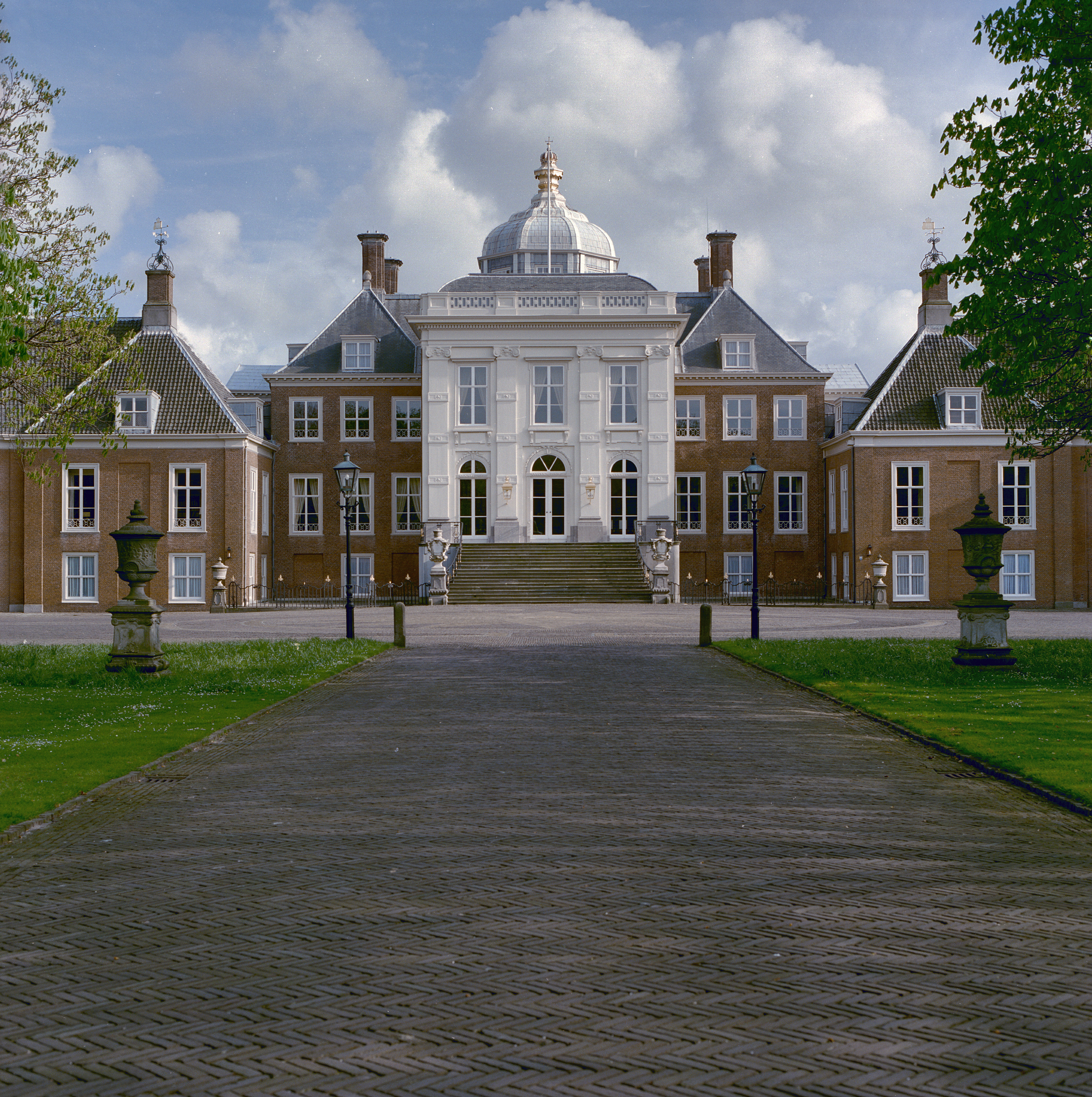
Palace Huis ten Bosch

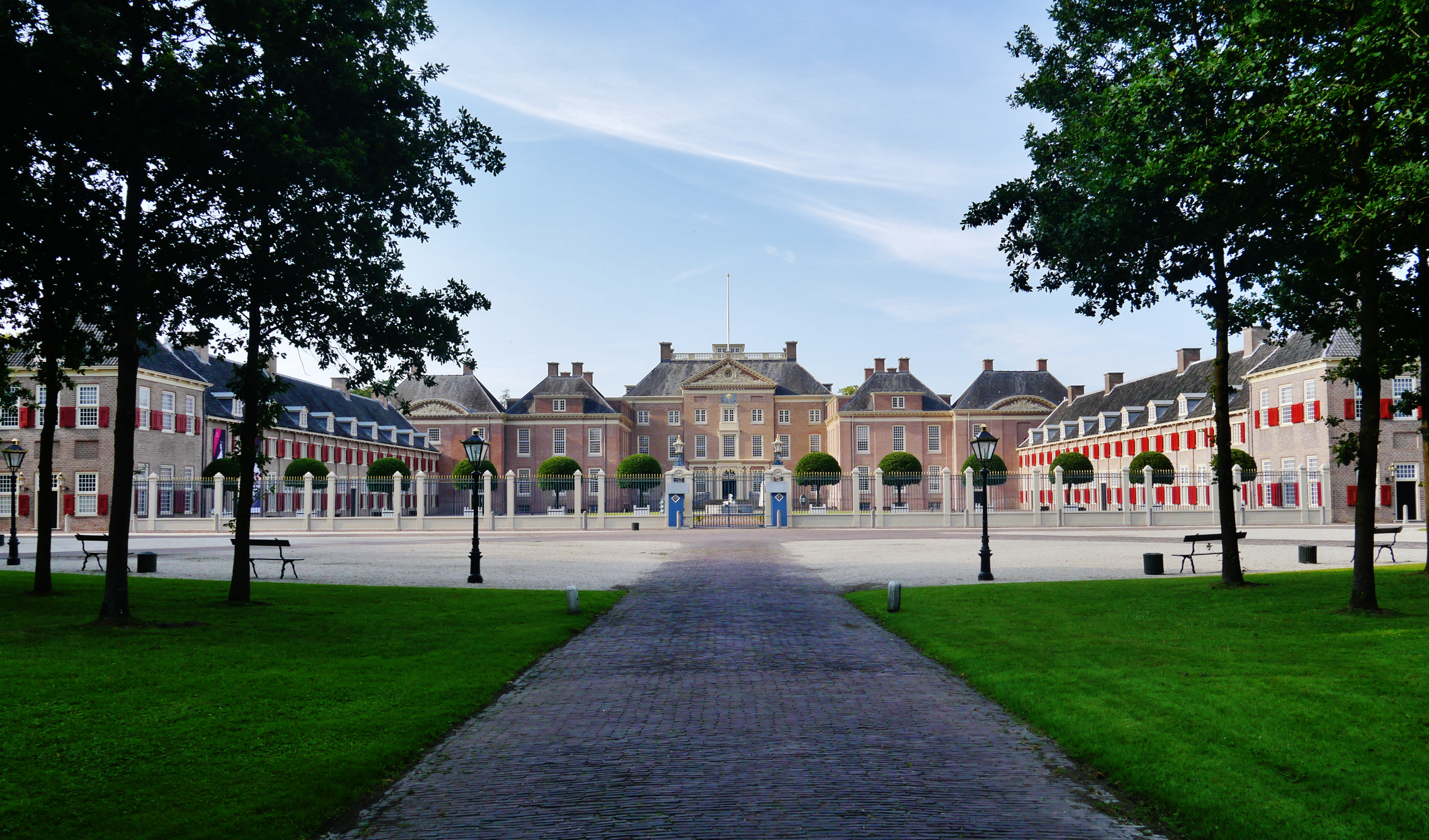
Het Loo Palace

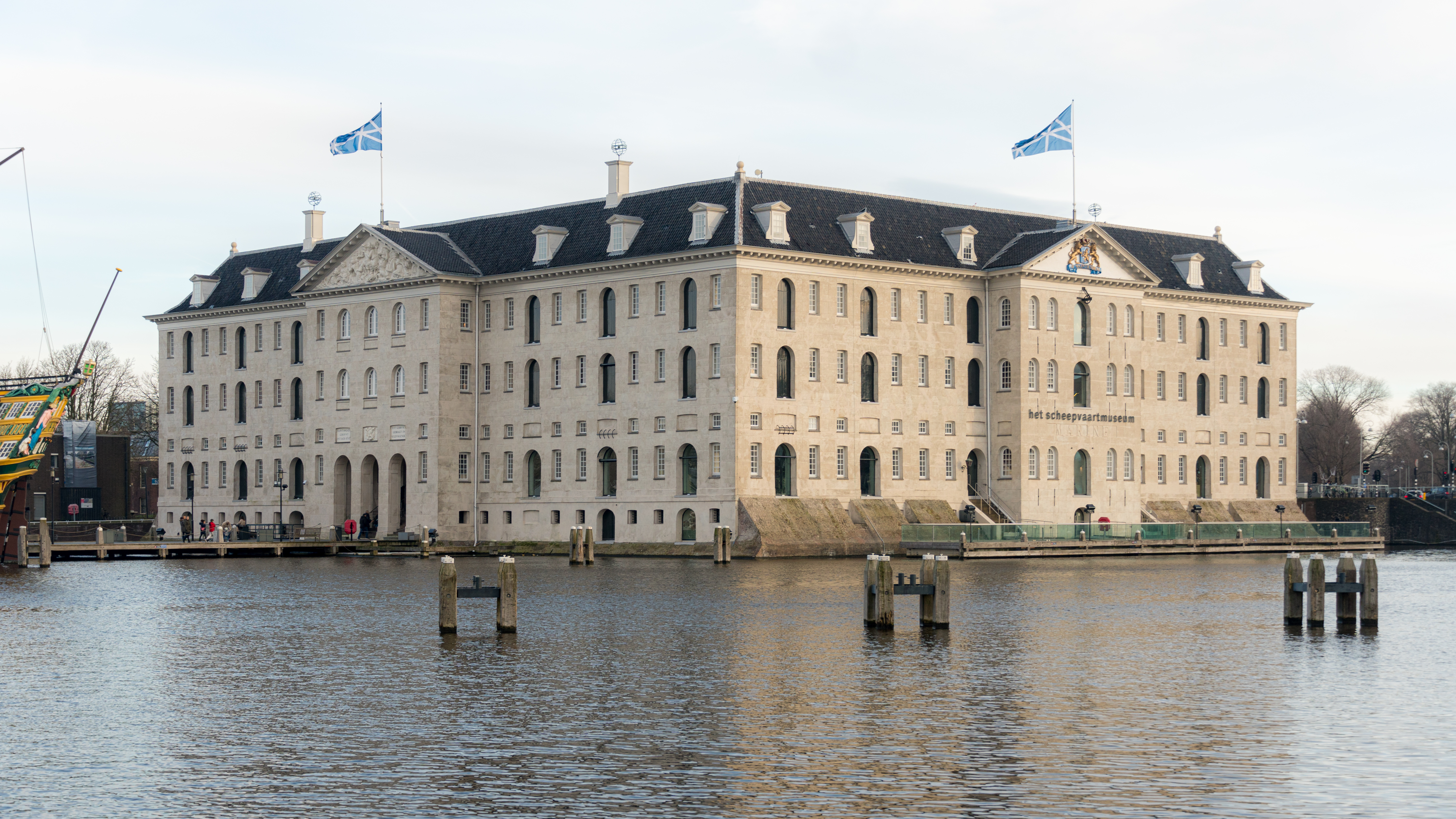
Het Scheepvaartmuseum

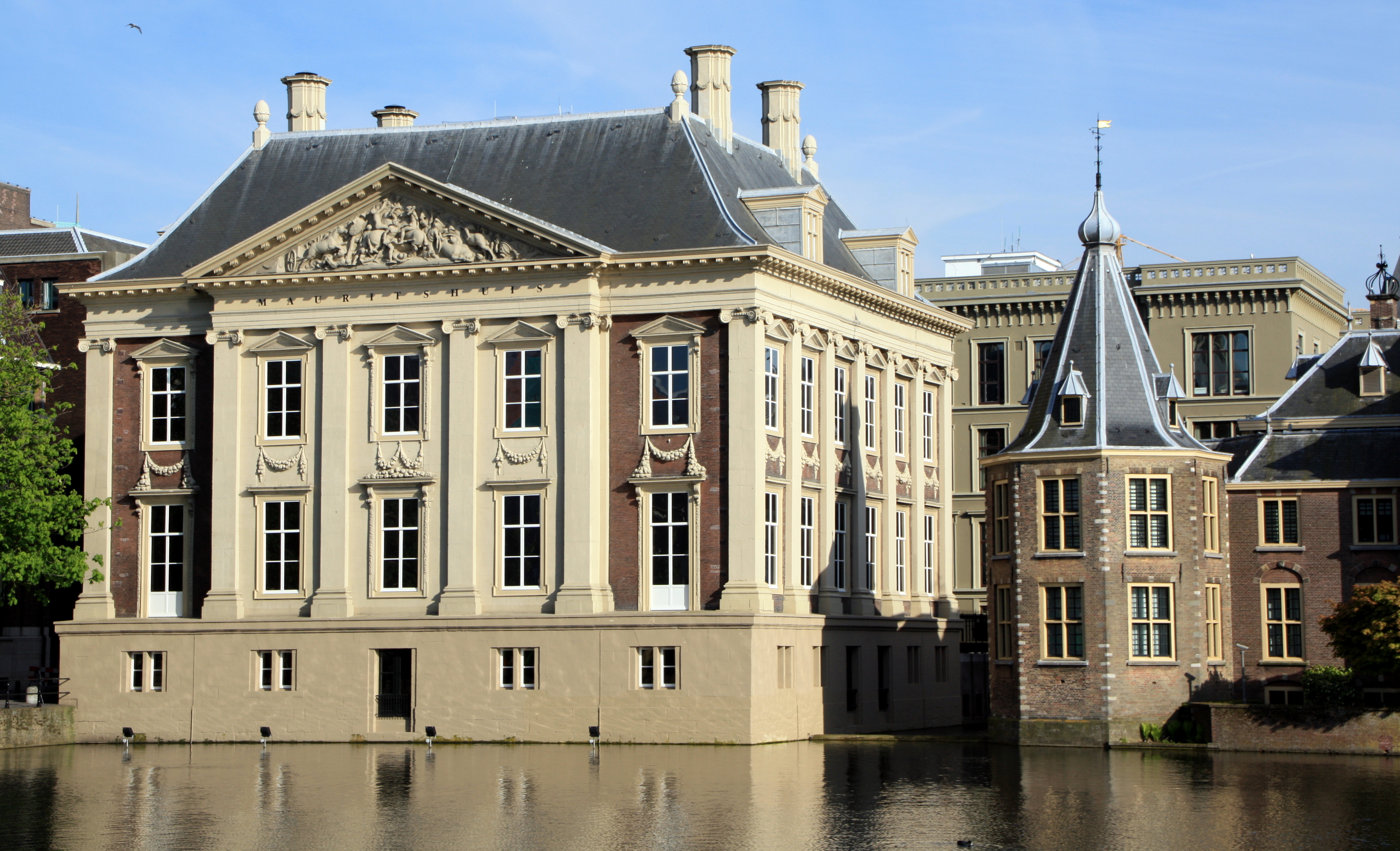
Mauritshuis

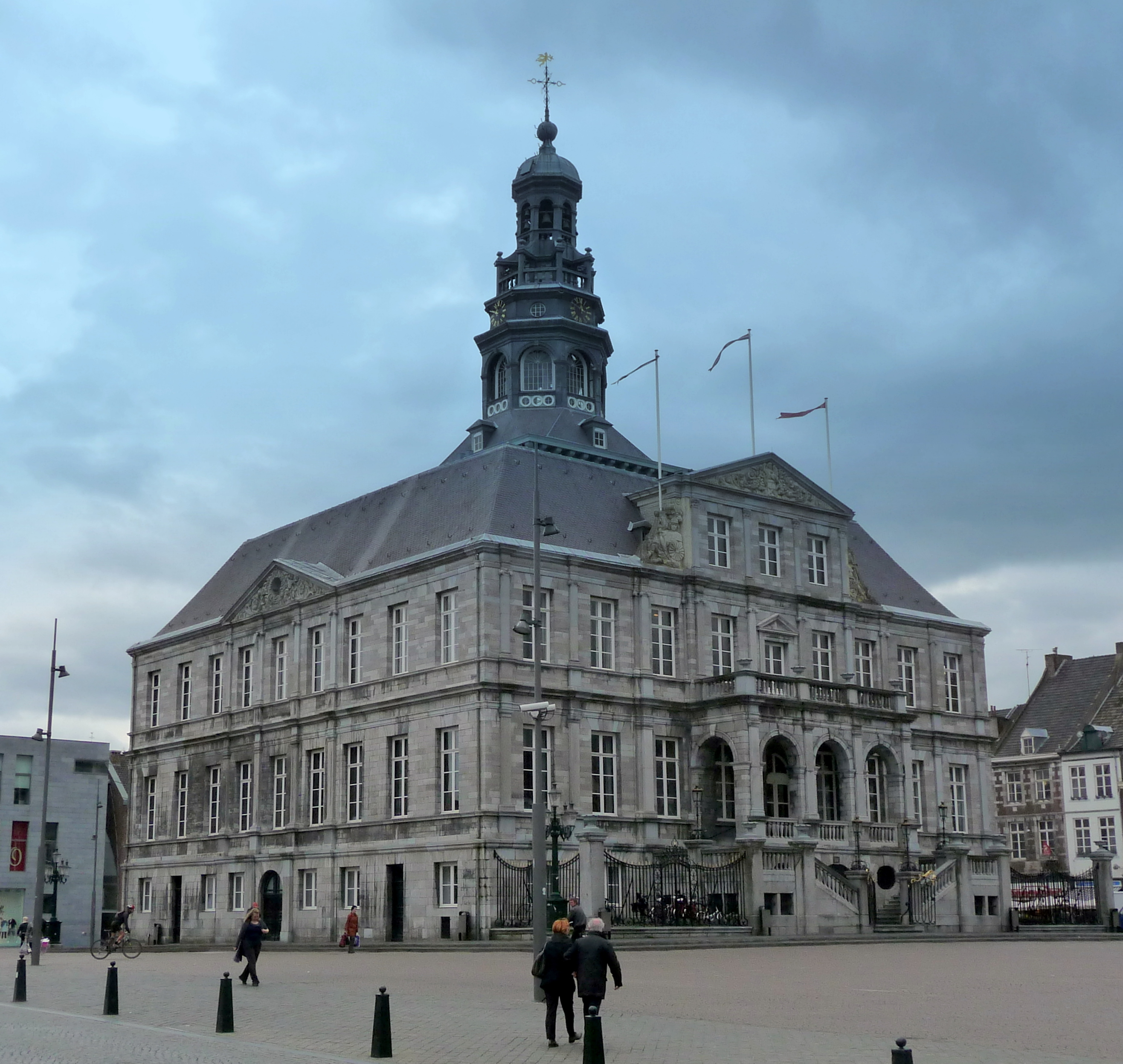
Maastricht City Hall

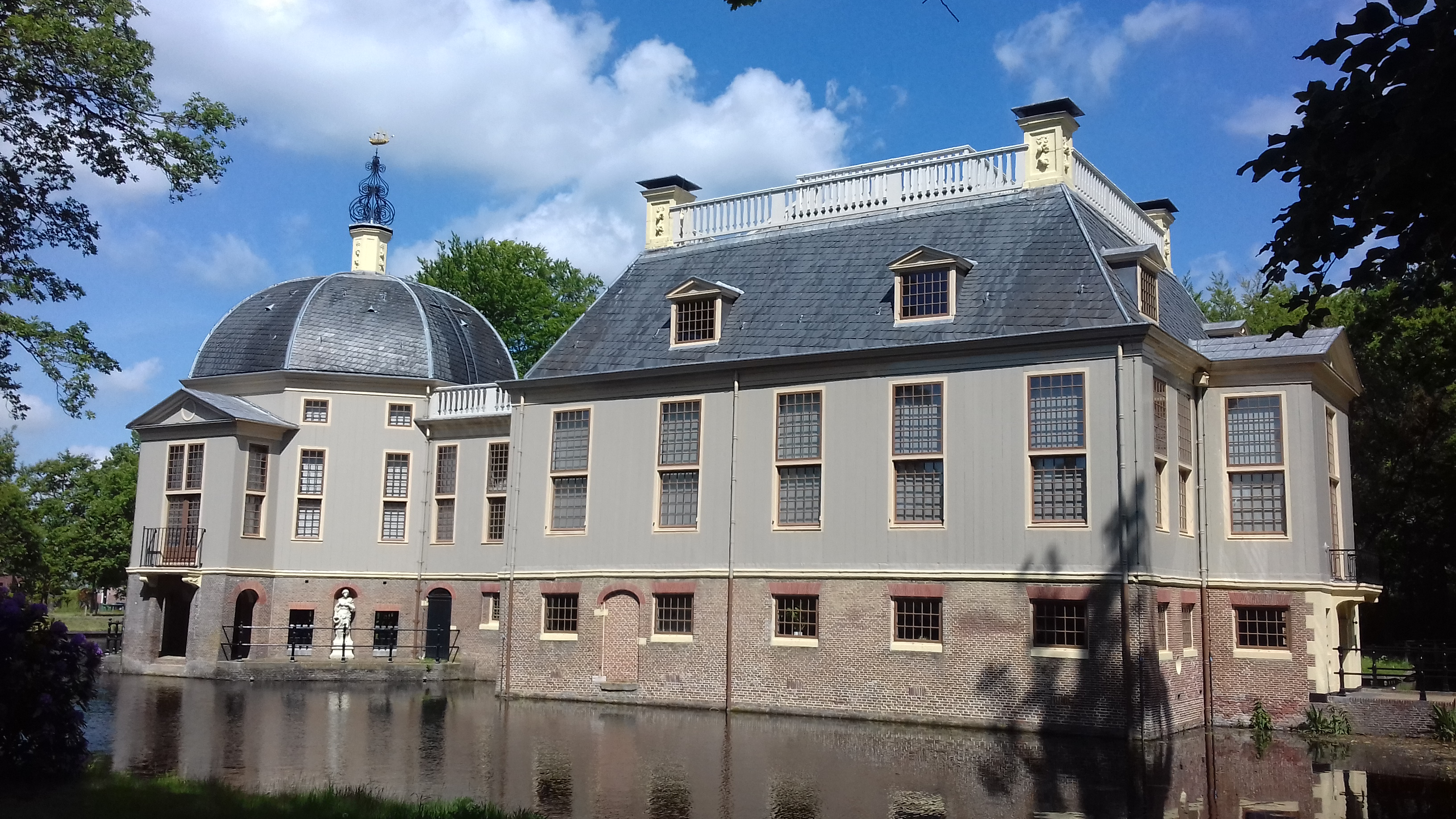
Trompenburgh

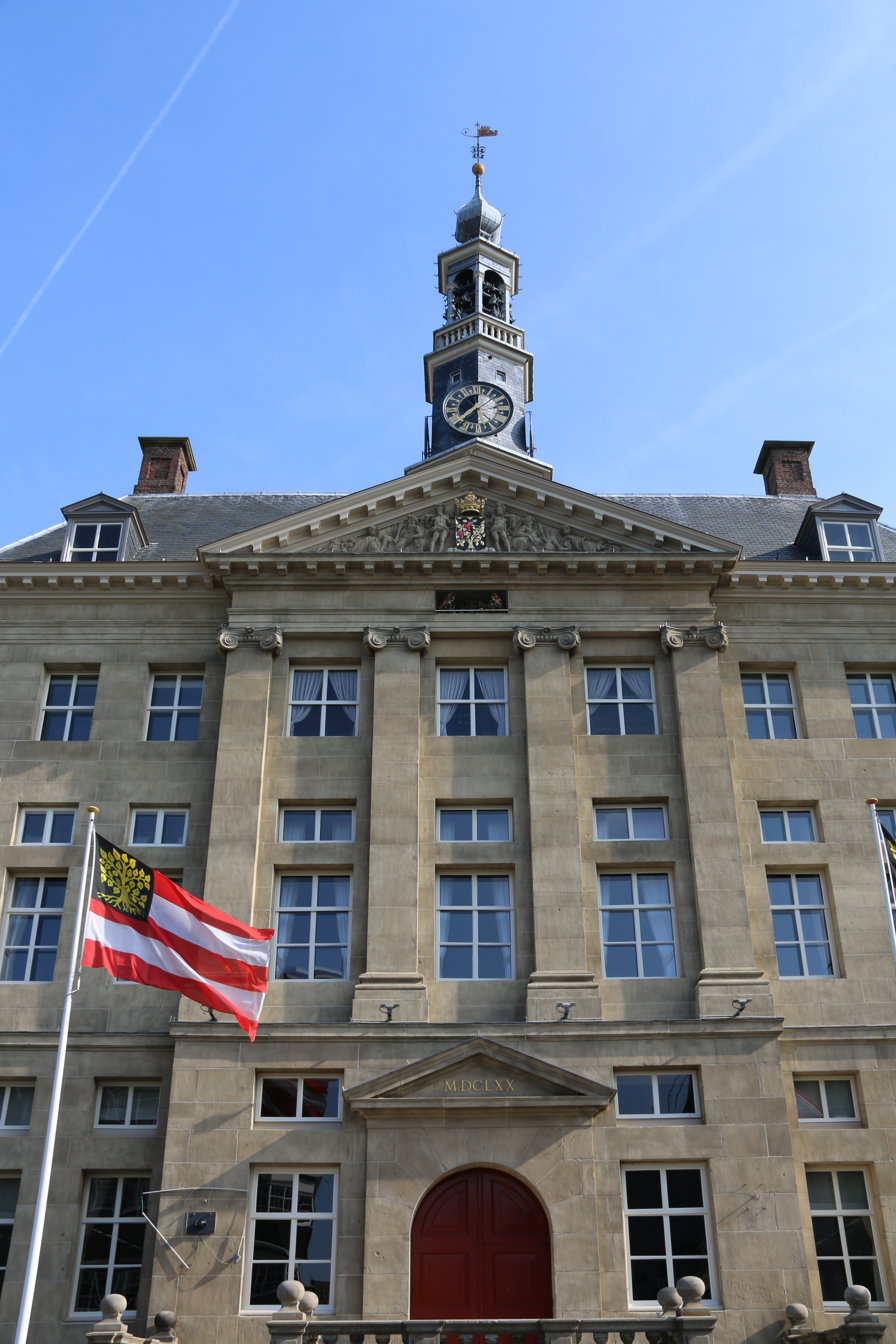
City hall 's-Hertogenbosch
