= Oostkerk, Middelburg =

Oostkerk
- Oostkerk "Koepelkerk"
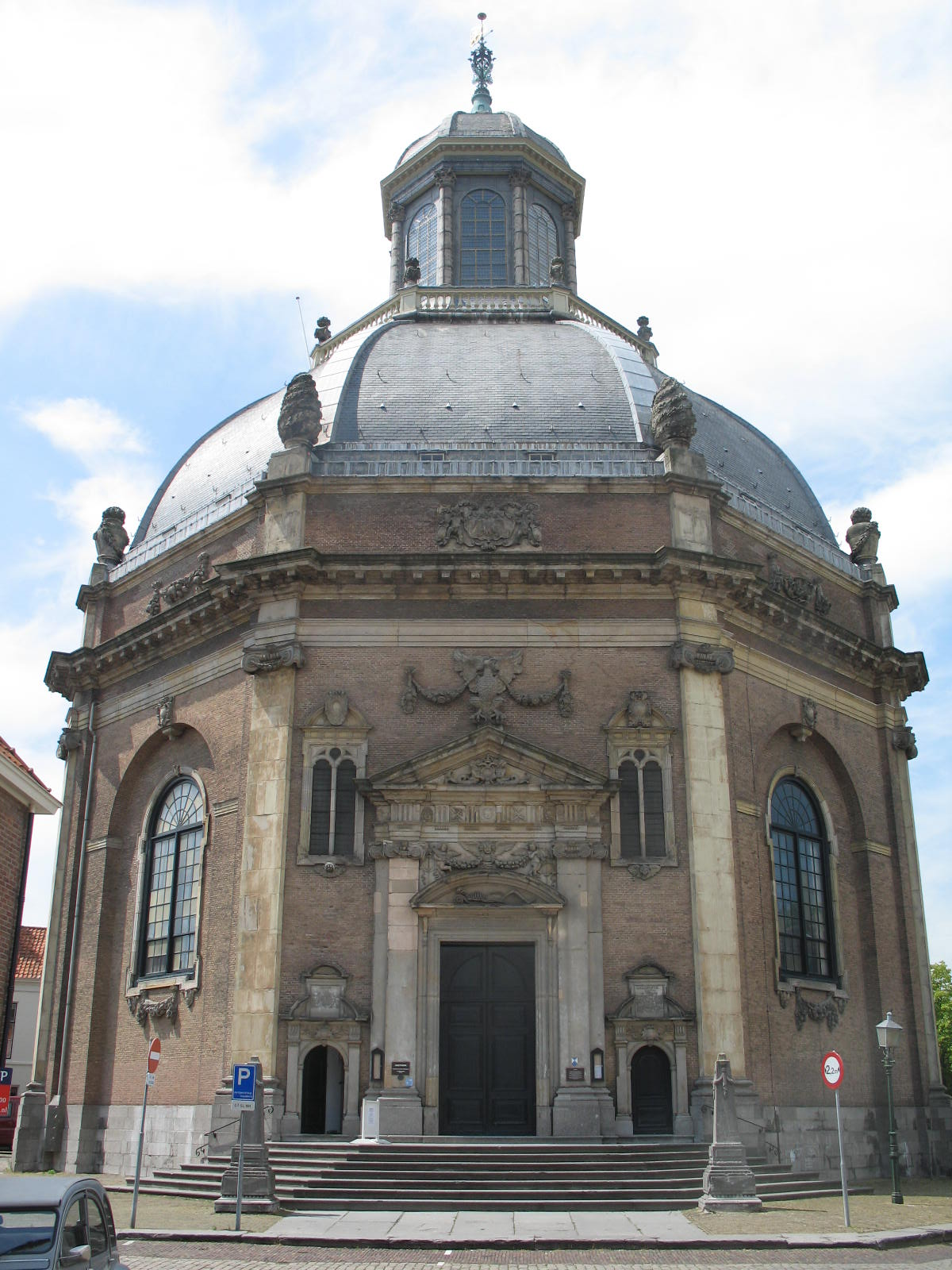
- View of main entrance
- Oostkerk
- 51°30′10″N 3°37′14″E
- Location: Oostkerkplein 1, Middelburg
- Country: Netherlands
- Denomination: Protestant

History
- Founded: 1667
- Dedicated: 1667

Architecture
- Architect: Arent van 's-Gravesande
- Style: neo-classical
- Years built: 1667

Administration
- Parish: Middelburg

The Oostkerk is a Protestant church in Middelburg. The church can be spotted on the Middelburg horizon by its characteristic round dome.

== History ==
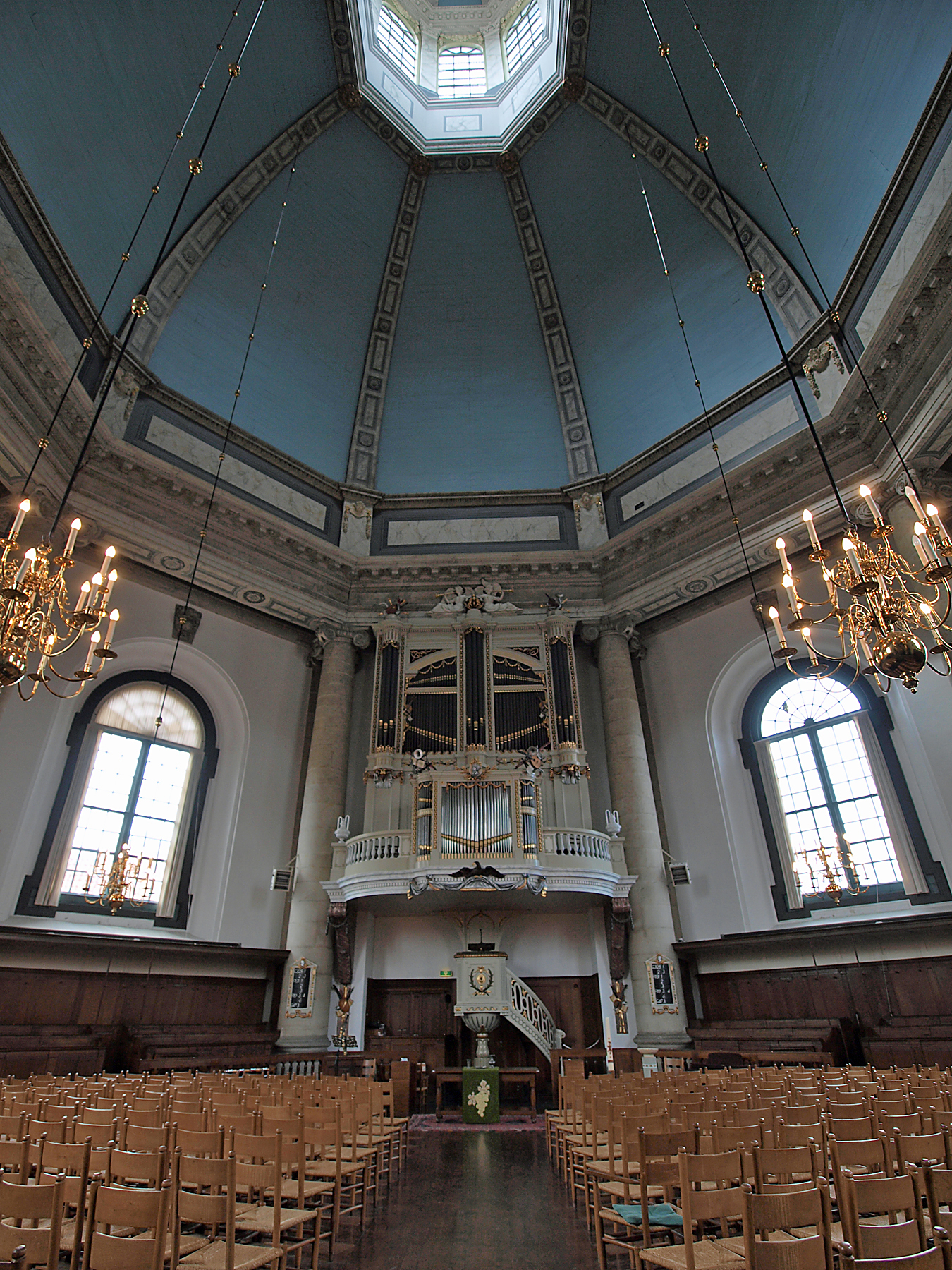
Interior Oostkerk in Middelburg

The church was designed by Bartholomeus Drijfhout and Pieter Post and was built between 1648 and 1667. After Drijfhout died in 1651, the building was continued under the Leiden architect Arent van 's-Gravesande, who had just completed the Marekerk in Leiden. The white organ was built by Gebr. de Rijckere from Kortrijk in 1782. Two stained glass windows from 1664 still exist in the church, and the klokkenstoel contains a bell by Claes Noorden and one by Jan Albert de Grave, 1715.

== See also ==
- 17th-century Western domes

Other 17th century "round" churches of the Netherlands:

- Marekerk, round church of Leiden
- Ronde Lutherse Kerk, round church of Amsterdam
