= Ronde Lutherse Kerk =

Church building in the Netherlands

- Ronde Lutherse Kerk "Koepelkerk"
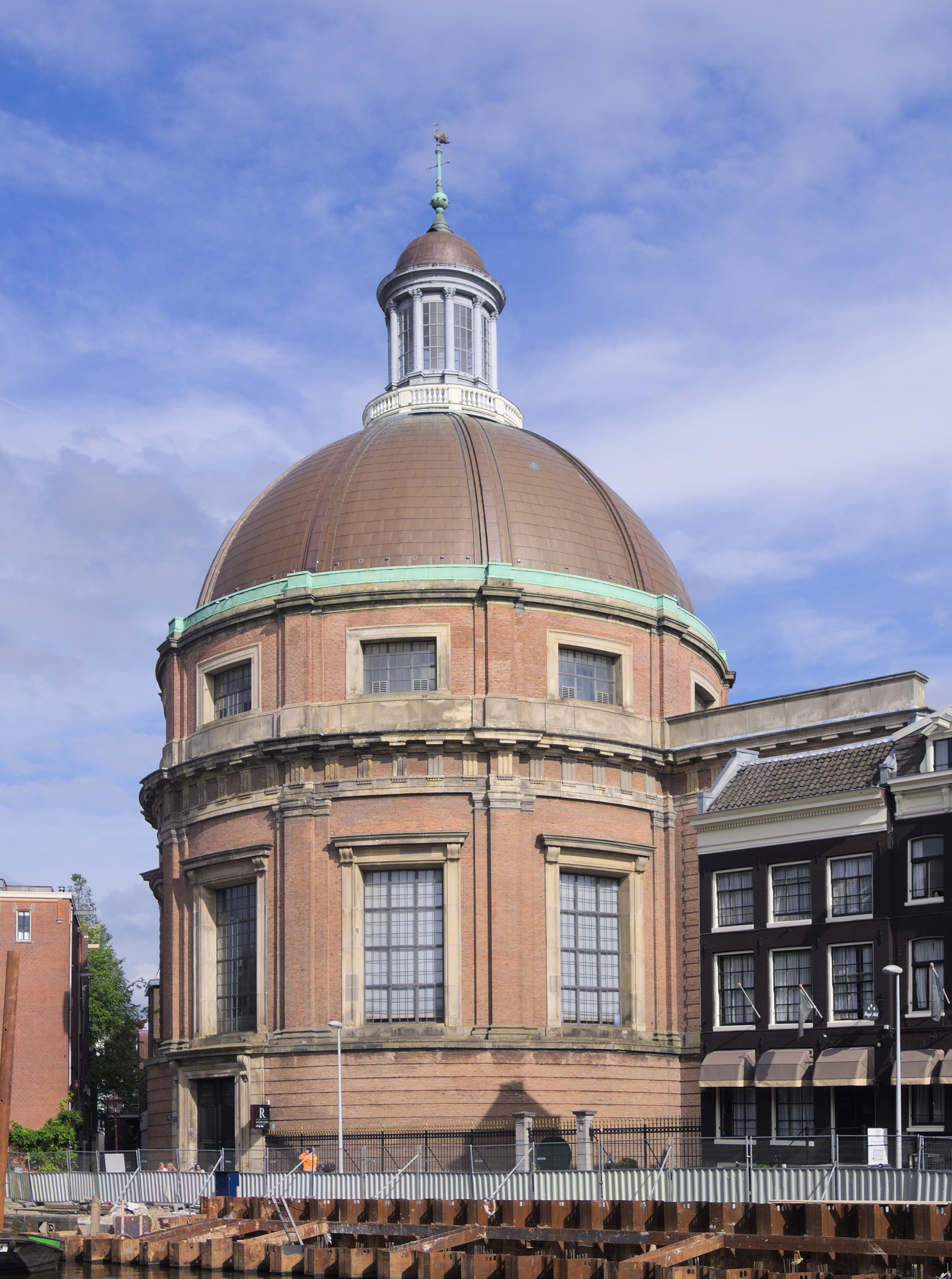
- View of the church from the Singel.
- Ronde Lutherse Kerk
- 52°22′40″N 4°53′37″E
- Location: Singel, Amsterdam
- Country: Netherlands
- Denomination: Lutheran

History
- Founded: 1668

Architecture
- Architect: Adriaan Dortsman
- Style: Dutch Baroque
- Years built: 1671
- Closed: 1935

Administration
- Parish: Amsterdam

The Ronde Lutherse Kerk ('Round Lutheran Church') or Koepelkerk ('Cupola Church') is a former Lutheran church in Amsterdam, Netherlands, on the Singel canal. The church can be easily seen from the Singel, identified by its copper dome.

== History ==
The church was designed by Adriaan Dortsman (ca. 1636-1682) and was opened in 1671. In 1822 the church was nearly destroyed; it was rebuilt in 1826. The organ was built by J Batz in 1830, and restored in 1983 by Flentrop Orgelbouw. In 1935 the Lutherans left the building and it became a concert hall. The neighboring Renaissance Amsterdam Hotel (formerly the Sonesta Hotel) rents the church building from the Lutheran Church. In 1975 a tunnel was built by the hotel to access the church. In 1983 the church was closed for restoration, but in 1993 the dome caught fire, and the church was again restored.

The church is not open to the public, but interested persons may request to view it at the Renaissance Hotel during business hours. Visitors can see the tunnel of the church, where the ground floor of the consistory has been converted to bathrooms and the upper floor to a meeting room. Of the main hall, the impressive columns, galleries, organ and pulpit can still be seen.

== See also ==
- Luther and the swan
- 17th-century Western domes

Other 17th century "round" churches of the Netherlands:

- Marekerk, round church of Leiden
- Oostkerk, round church of Middelburg
