= Van Heel =

Dutch surname

van Heel or Van Heel is a surname of Dutch origin.

It typically refers to someone who originated from or lived near the small town of Heel in the province of Limburg in the southern Netherlands (near the Belgian border, in the municipality of Maasgouw). Some sources also mention a possible connection to Hedel in Gelderland (central Netherlands), where the name could have evolved through dialectal or spelling variations. Notable people with the surname include:

- Aemilianus van Heel, Franciscan friar and missionary.
- Biem Dudok van Heel (1914–1995), Dutch sailor
- Bram van Heel, Dutch professor of physics.
- Marie-France van Heel, businesswoman and spouse of British prime minister Andy Burnham.
- Michiel Dudok van Heel (1924–2003), Dutch sailor
- Puck van Heel (1904–1984), Dutch footballer
- Wim van Heel (1922–1972), Dutch field hockey player

== See also ==
- Van Hedel
