= Leiden =

- City and municipality
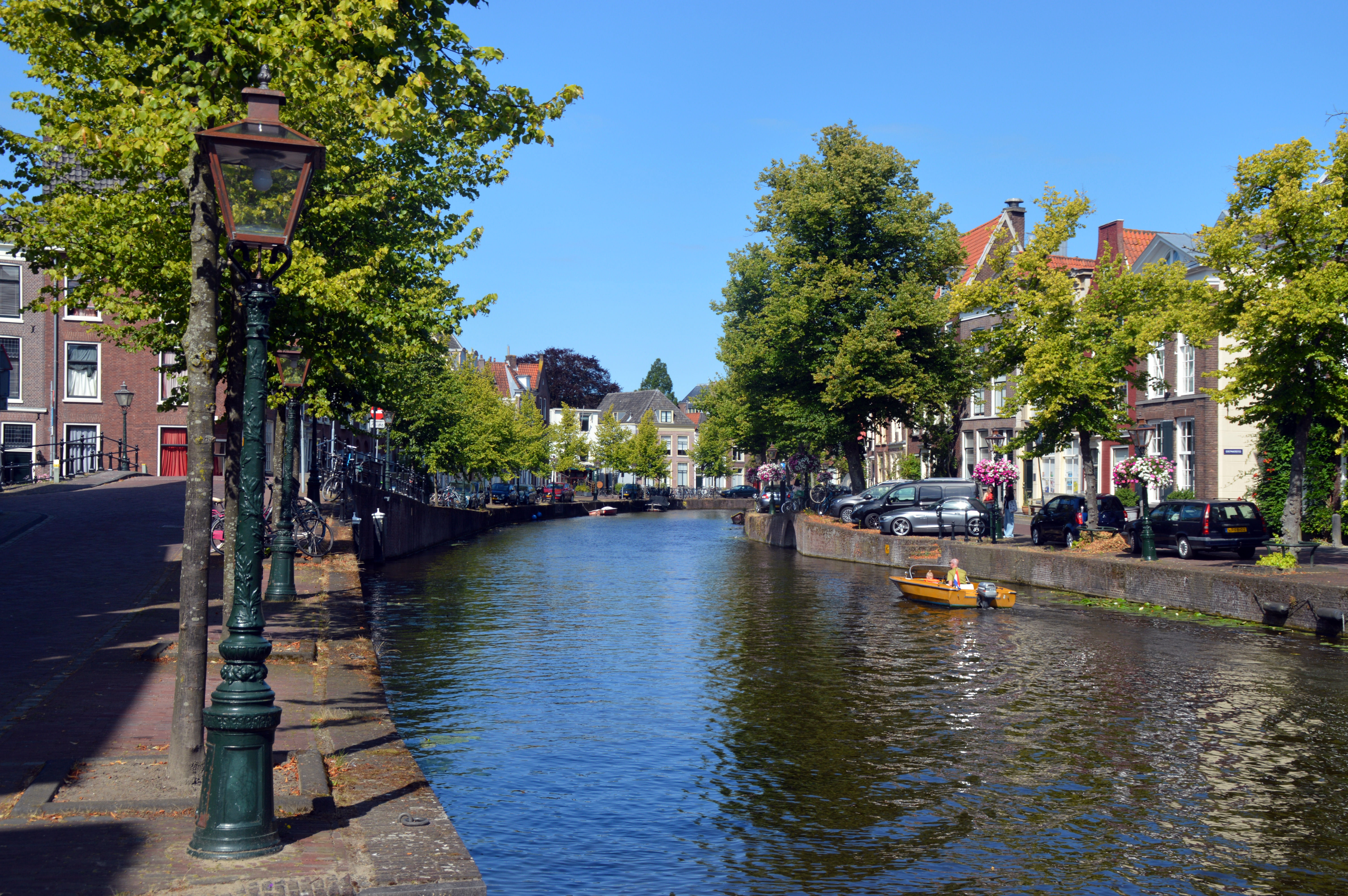
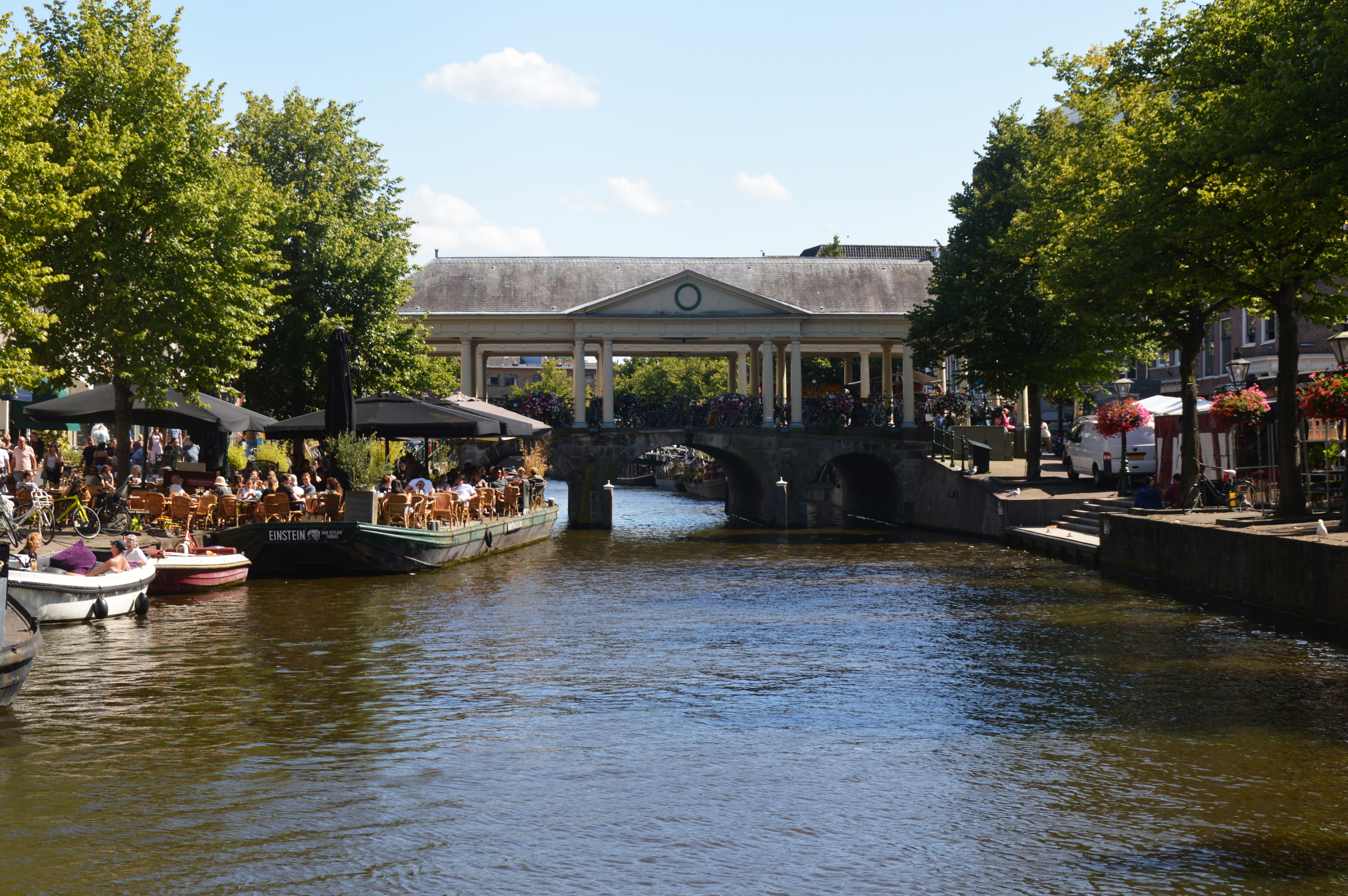
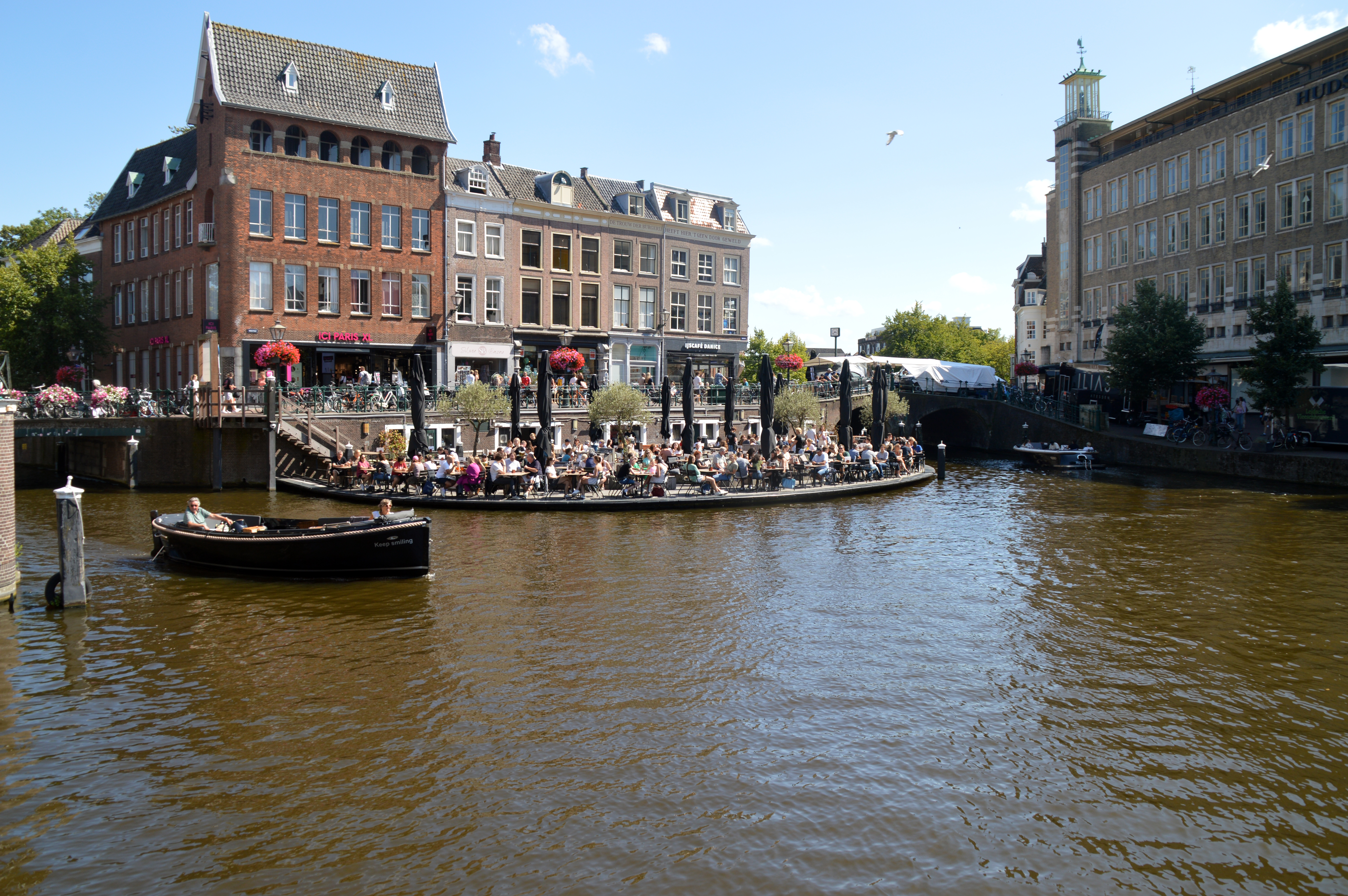
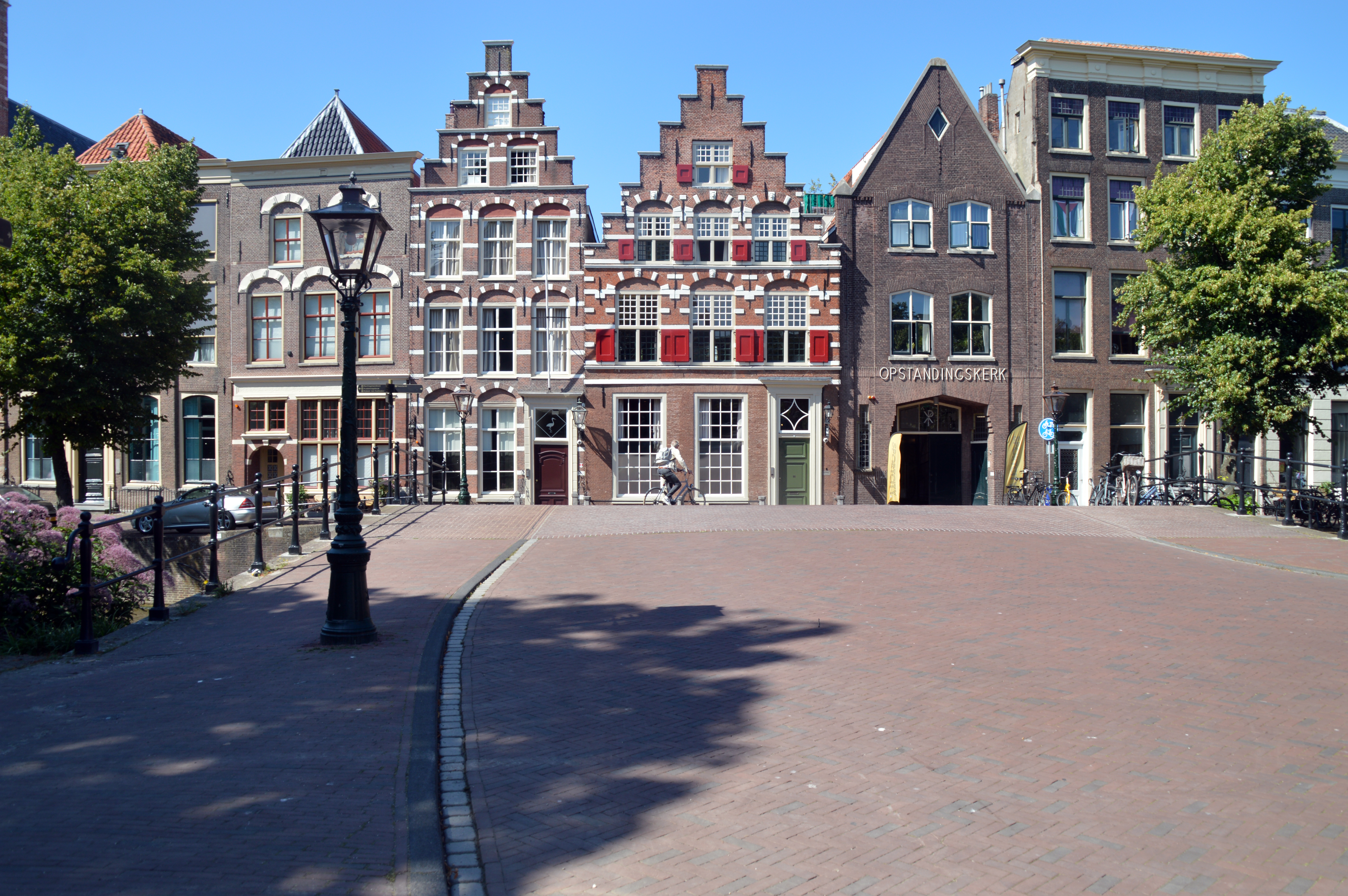
- Rapenburg Koornbrug Aalmarkt Steenschuur Topographic map

- Flag Coat of arms
- Nickname: Sleutelstad (Key City)
- Interactive map of Leiden
- Location within the Netherlands Location within Europe
- Coordinates: 52.16°N 4.49°E
- Country: Netherlands
- Province: South Holland

Government
  - Body: Municipal council
  - Mayor: Peter Heijkoop (CDA)

Area
  - Municipality: 23.27 km^{2} (8.98 sq mi)
  - Land: 21.91 km^{2} (8.46 sq mi)
  - Water: 1.36 km^{2} (0.53 sq mi)
- Elevation: 0 m (0 ft)

Population (Municipality, January 2021; Urban and Metro, May 2014)
  - Municipality: 124,093
  - Density: 5,664/km^{2} (14,670/sq mi)
  - Urban: 238,493
  - Metro: 344,299
- Demonym: Leidenaar
- Time zone: UTC+1 (CET)
  - Summer (DST): UTC+2 (CEST)
- Postcodes: 2300–2334
- Area code: 071
- Website: gemeente.leiden.nl

Leiden (/ˈlaɪdən/ LY-dən; Dutch: [ˈlɛidə(n)]; in English and archaic Dutch also Leyden) is a city and municipality in the province of South Holland, Netherlands. The municipality of Leiden has a population of 127,046 (31 January 2023), but the city forms one densely connected agglomeration with its suburbs Oegstgeest, Leiderdorp, Voorschoten and Zoeterwoude with 215,602 inhabitants. The Netherlands Central Bureau of Statistics (CBS) further includes Katwijk in the agglomeration which makes the total population of the Leiden urban agglomeration 282,207. Further, Teylingen, Noordwijk, and Noordwijkerhout are included in the larger Leiden urban area, which has 365,913 inhabitants. Leiden is located on the Oude Rijn, at a distance of some 20 km (12 mi) from The Hague to its south and some 40 km (25 mi) from Amsterdam to its north. The recreational area of the Kaag Lakes (Kagerplassen) lies just to the northeast of Leiden.

A university city since 1575, Leiden has been one of Europe's most prominent scientific centres for more than four centuries. University buildings are scattered throughout the city and the many students from all over the world give the city a bustling, vivid and international atmosphere. Many important scientific discoveries have been made here, giving rise to Leiden's motto: 'City of Discoveries'. The city houses Leiden University, the oldest university of the Netherlands, and Leiden University Medical Center. Leiden University is one of Europe's top universities, with thirteen Nobel Prize winners. It is a member of the League of European Research Universities and positioned highly in all international academic rankings. It is twinned with Oxford, the location of the United Kingdom's oldest university. Leiden University and Leiden University of Applied Sciences (Leidse Hogeschool) together have around 35,000 students. Modern scientific medical research and teaching started in the early 18th century in Leiden with Boerhaave.

Leiden is a city with a rich cultural heritage, not only in science, but also in the arts. The painter Rembrandt was born and educated in Leiden. Other Leiden painters include Lucas van Leyden, Jan van Goyen and Jan Steen.

== History ==
Leiden was formed on an artificial hill (today called the Burcht van Leiden) at the confluence of the rivers Oude and Nieuwe Rijn (Old and New Rhine). The settlement was called Leithon. The name is from Germanic *leitha (canal).

Leiden has erroneously been associated with the Roman outpost Lugdunum Batavorum. This was thought to be located at the Burcht of Leiden, and the city's name was thought to be derived from the Latin name Lugdunum. However, the castellum was in fact closer to the town of Katwijk, whereas the Roman settlement near Leiden was called Matilo.

=== Siege of 1420 ===
In 1420, during the Hook and Cod wars, Duke John III of Bavaria along with his army marched from Gouda in the direction of Leiden in order to conquer the city since Leiden did not pay the new Count of Holland Jacqueline, Countess of Hainaut, his niece and only daughter of Count William VI of Holland.

Burgrave Filips of Wassenaar and the other local noblemen of the Hook faction assumed that the duke would besiege Leiden first and send small units out to conquer the surrounding citadels. But John of Bavaria chose to attack the citadels first.

He rolled the cannons along with his army but one which was too heavy went by ship. By firing at the walls and gates with iron balls the citadels fell one by one. Within a week John of Bavaria conquered the castles of Poelgeest, Ter Does, Hoichmade, de Zijl, ter Waerd, Warmond and de Paddenpoel.

On 24 June the army appeared before the walls of Leiden. On 17 August 1420, after a two-month siege, the city surrendered to John of Bavaria. The burgrave Filips of Wassenaar was stripped of his offices and rights and lived out his last years in captivity.

=== 16th–18th centuries ===
Leiden flourished in the 16th and 17th century. At the close of the 15th century, the weaving establishments of Leiden (mainly broadcloth) were very important. In the same period, Leiden developed an important printing and publishing industry. Printers Lucas van Leyden and Otto van Veen lived here, and so did Christophe Plantin. One of Christoffel's pupils was Lodewijk Elzevir (1547–1617), who established the largest bookshop and printing works in Leiden, a business continued by his descendants through 1712.

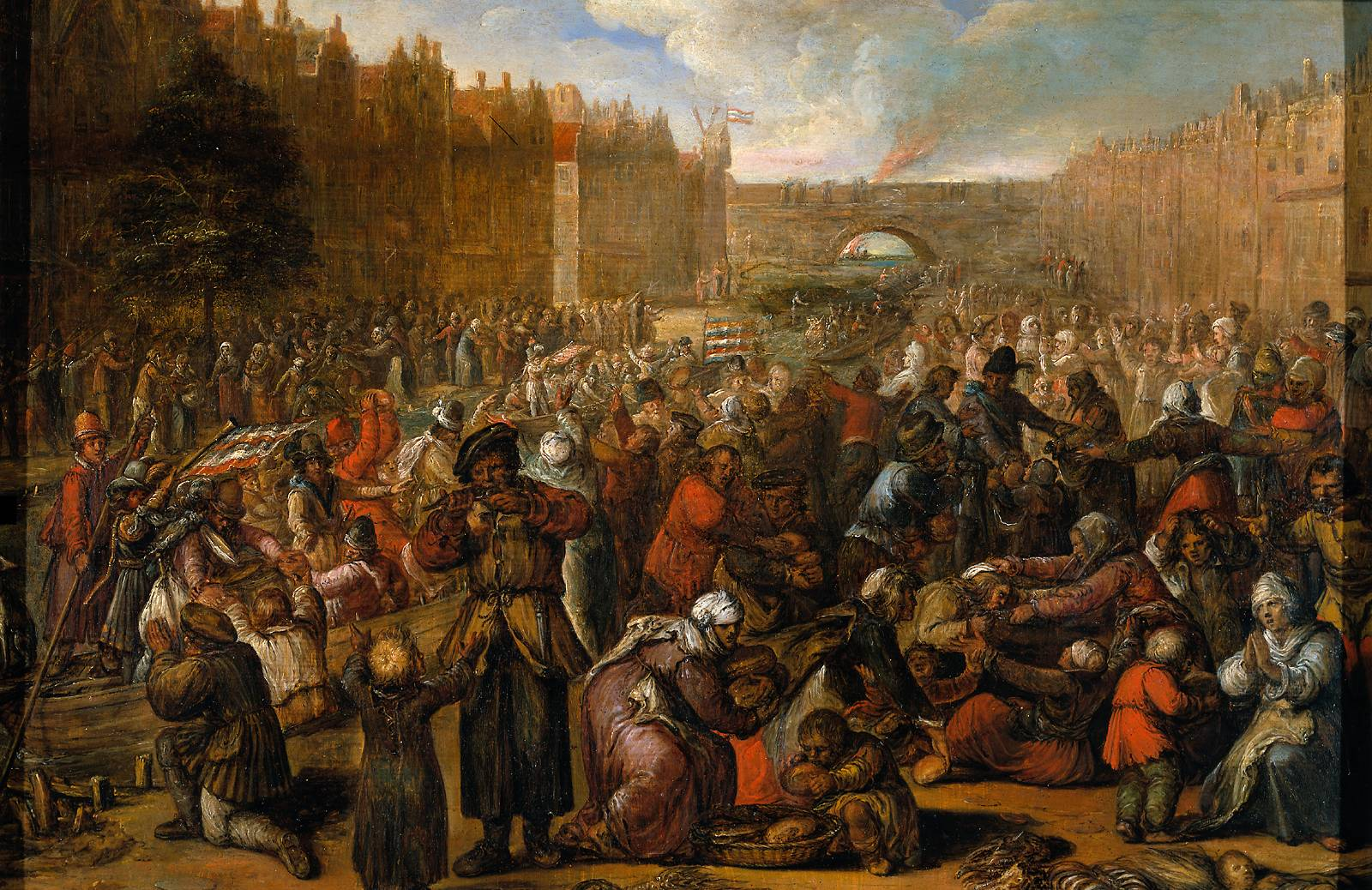
Relief of Leiden (1574), painting by Otto van Veen. Inundated meadows allow the Dutch fleet access to the Spanish infantry positions.

In 1572, the city sided with the Dutch Revolt against Spanish rule and played an important role in the Eighty Years' War. It was besieged from May to October 1574 by the Spanish but was relieved by the cutting of the dikes, thus enabling ships to carry provisions to the inhabitants. William of Orange founded the University of Leiden in 1575 as a reward for their heroic defense. The end of the siege is still celebrated in Leiden on October 3 each year. According to tradition, the citizens of Leiden were offered the choice between a university and a certain exemption from taxes and chose the university. The siege is notable also for being the first instance in Europe of the issuance of paper money, with paper taken from prayer books being stamped using coin dies when silver ran out.

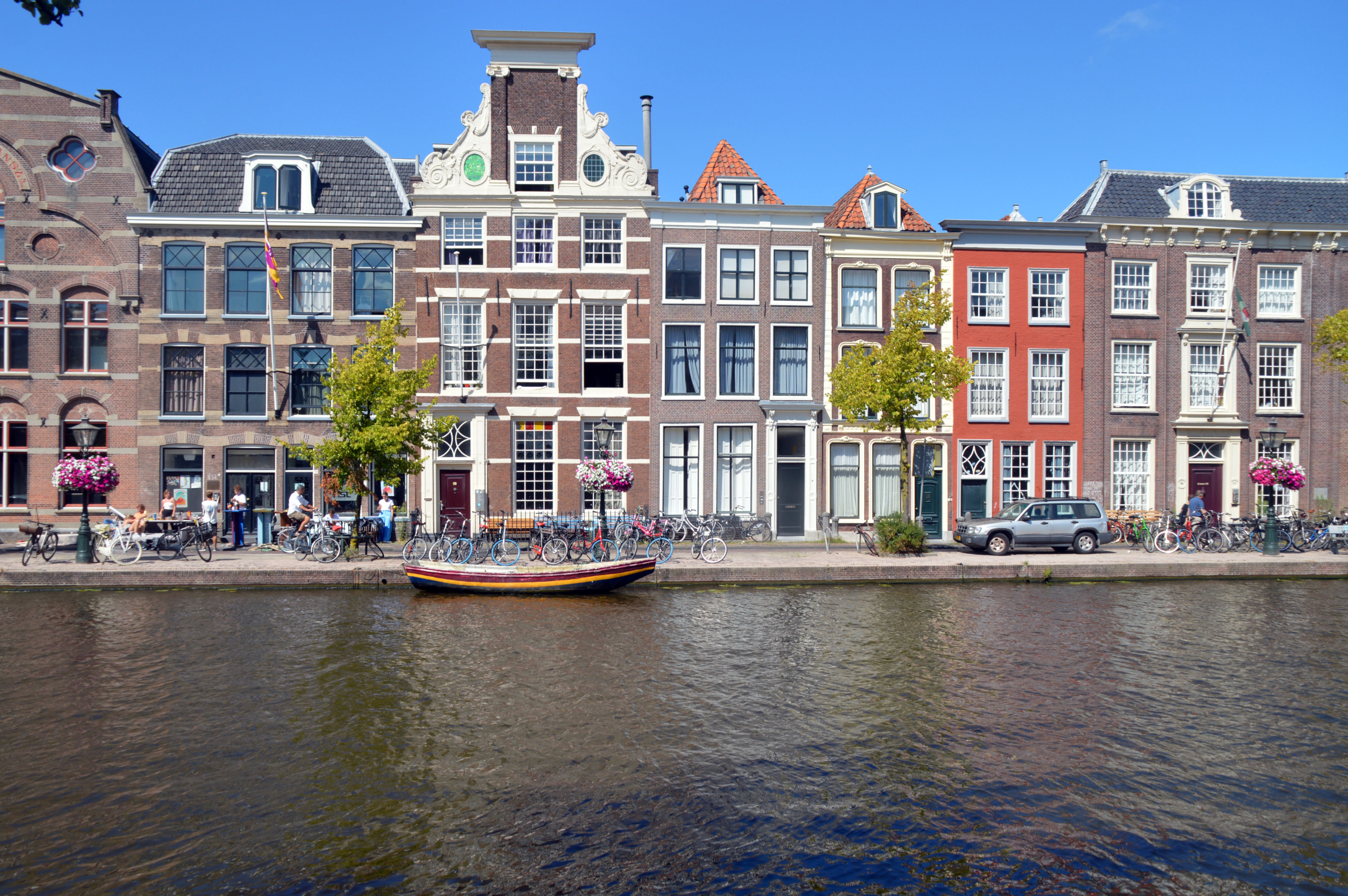
17th-century houses along the Oude Vest

Leiden is known as the place where the Pilgrims and some of the settlers of New Amsterdam lived, operating a printing press for a time in the early 17th century before their departure to Massachusetts and New Amsterdam in the New World. US President George Bush was one of the descendants of these Pilgrims, which was shown to him during his visit to Leiden in 1989.

Leiden prospered in the 17th century, in part because of the impetus to the textile industry by refugees from Flanders. The city had lost about a third of its 15,000 citizens during the siege of 1574, but it quickly recovered to 45,000 in 1622 and may have come near to 70,000 c. 1670. During the Dutch Golden Era, Leiden was the second largest city of Holland after Amsterdam. It played a crucial role in the establishment of modern chemistry and medicine due to the work by Herman Boerhaave (1668–1738).

Leiden slumped from the late 17th century on, mainly due to the decline of the textile industries. The baize manufacture was given up at the beginning of the 19th century, although industry remained central to Leiden economy. This decline can be seen in the fall in population, which had sunk to 30,000 between 1796 and 1811, and in 1904 was 56,044.

Leiden was the publishing place from the 17th to the early 19th century of the important journal Nouvelles Extraordinaires de Divers Endroits, known also as Gazette de Leyde.

=== 19th–20th centuries ===
On 12 January 1807, a catastrophe struck the city when a boat loaded with 17,400 kg (38,360 lb) of gunpowder blew up in the middle of Leiden. 151 people were killed, over 2,000 were injured and some 220 homes were destroyed. King Louis Bonaparte personally visited the city to provide assistance to the victims. Although located in the centre of the city, the area destroyed remained empty for many years. In 1886 the space was turned into a public park, the Van der Werff park.

In 1842, the railroad from Leiden to Haarlem was inaugurated and one year later the railway to The Hague (Den Haag) was completed, resulting in some social and economic improvement. Perhaps the most important piece of Dutch history contributed by Leiden was the Constitution of the Netherlands. Johan Rudolf Thorbecke (1798–1872) wrote the Dutch Constitution in April 1848 in his house at Garenmarkt 9 in Leiden.

Leiden's reputation as the "city of books" continued through the 19th century with the establishment of publishing dynasties by Evert Jan Brill and Albertus Willem Sijthoff. Sijthoff, who rose to prominence in the trade of translated books, wrote a letter in 1899 to Queen Wilhelmina regarding his opposition to becoming a signatory to the Berne Convention for the Protection of Literary and Artistic Works. He felt that international copyright restrictions would stifle the Dutch publishing industry.

Leiden began to expand beyond its 17th-century moats around 1896 and the number of citizens surpassed 50,000 in 1900. After 1920, new industries were established in the city, such as the canning and metal industries. During World War II, Leiden was hit hard by Allied bombardments. The areas surrounding the railway station and Marewijk were almost completely destroyed.

The University of Leiden has been the site of many discoveries, including Snell's law (by Willebrord Snellius), and the Leyden jar, a capacitor made from a glass jar, invented in Leiden by Pieter van Musschenbroek in 1746. Another development was in cryogenics: Heike Kamerlingh Onnes (1913 Nobel Prize in Physics) liquefied helium for the first time (1908) and later managed to reach a temperature of less than one degree above the absolute minimum. Albert Einstein also spent some time at Leiden University during his early to middle career.

=== Leiden today ===
The city's biggest and most popular annual festival is celebrated on 3 October and is called simply 3 Oktober. The people of Leiden celebrate the end of the Spanish siege of 1574. It typically takes place over the course of two to three days, with the evening of 2 October and the day of 3 October being the most important, and includes parades, a hutspot feast, historical reenactments, a funfair and other events. Since 2006, the city has also hosted the annual Leiden International Film Festival.

Leiden has important functions as a shopping and trade centre for communities around the city.

The city also houses the Eurotransplant, the international organization responsible for the mediation and allocation of organ donation procedures in Austria, Belgium, Croatia, Germany, Luxembourg, the Netherlands and Slovenia. Leiden also houses the headquarters of Airbus, a global pan-European aerospace and defence corporation and a leading defence and military contractor worldwide.

== Rivers, canals and parks ==
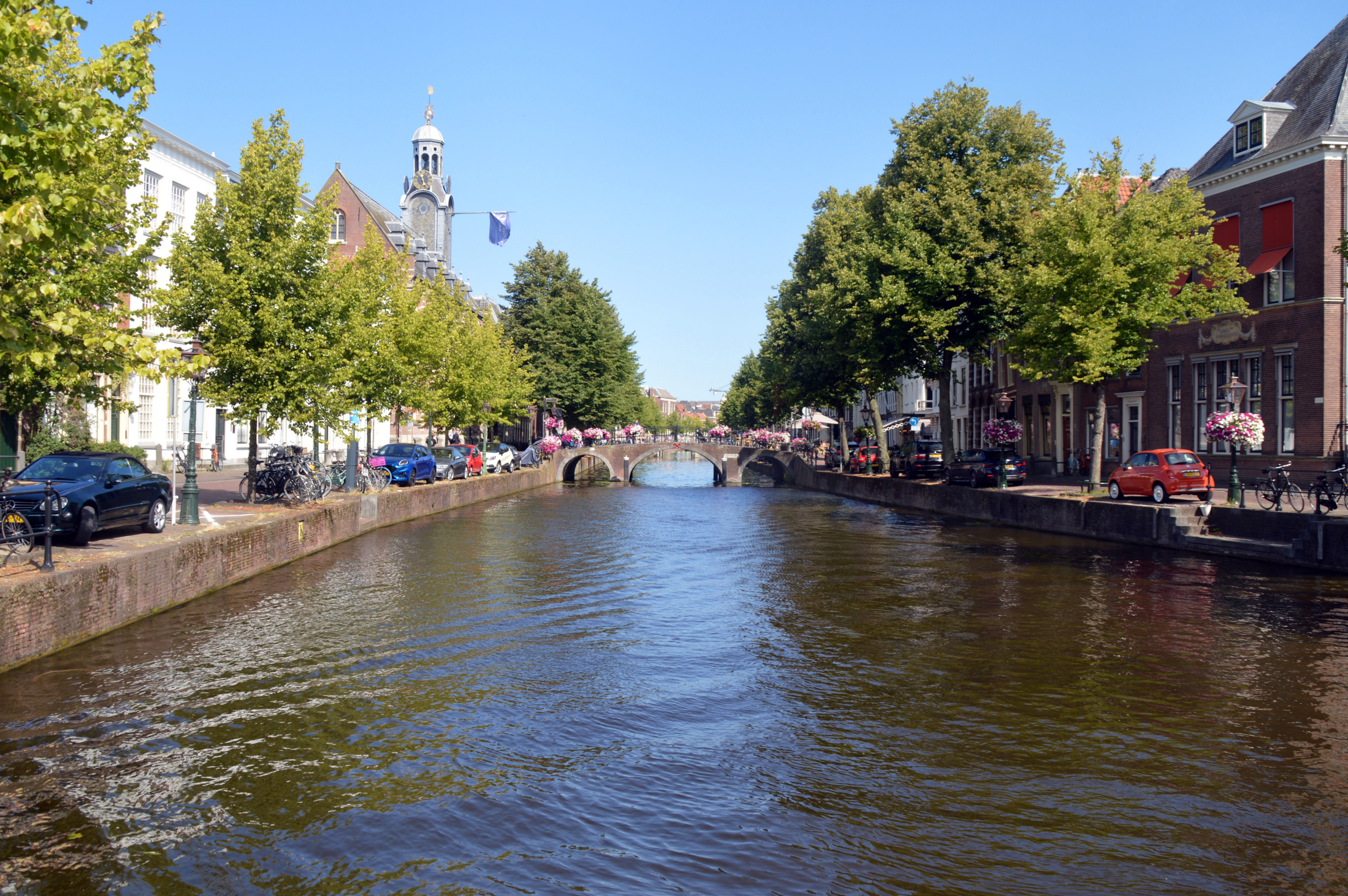
Leiden Academic Building and Nonnenbrug

The two branches of the Oude Rijn, which enter Leiden on the east, unite in the centre of the city. The city is further intersected by numerous small canals with tree-bordered quays. On the west side of the city, the Hortus Botanicus and other gardens extend along the old Singel, or outer canal. The Leidse Hout park, which contains a small deer park, lies on the northwest border with Oegstgeest. The Van der Werf Park is named after the mayor Pieter Adriaansz. van der Werff, who defended the city against the Spaniards in 1574. The city was beleaguered for months and many died from famine. The open space for the park was formed by the accidental explosion of a ship loaded with gunpowder in 1807, which destroyed hundreds of houses, including that of the Elsevier family of printers.

== Buildings of interest ==
Because of the economic decline from the end of the 17th until the middle of the 19th century, much of the 16th- and 17th-century city centre is still intact. It is the second largest 17th-century town centre in the Netherlands, the largest being Amsterdam's city centre.

A hundred buildings in the centre are decorated with large murals of poetry, part of a wall poem project active from 1992, and still ongoing.

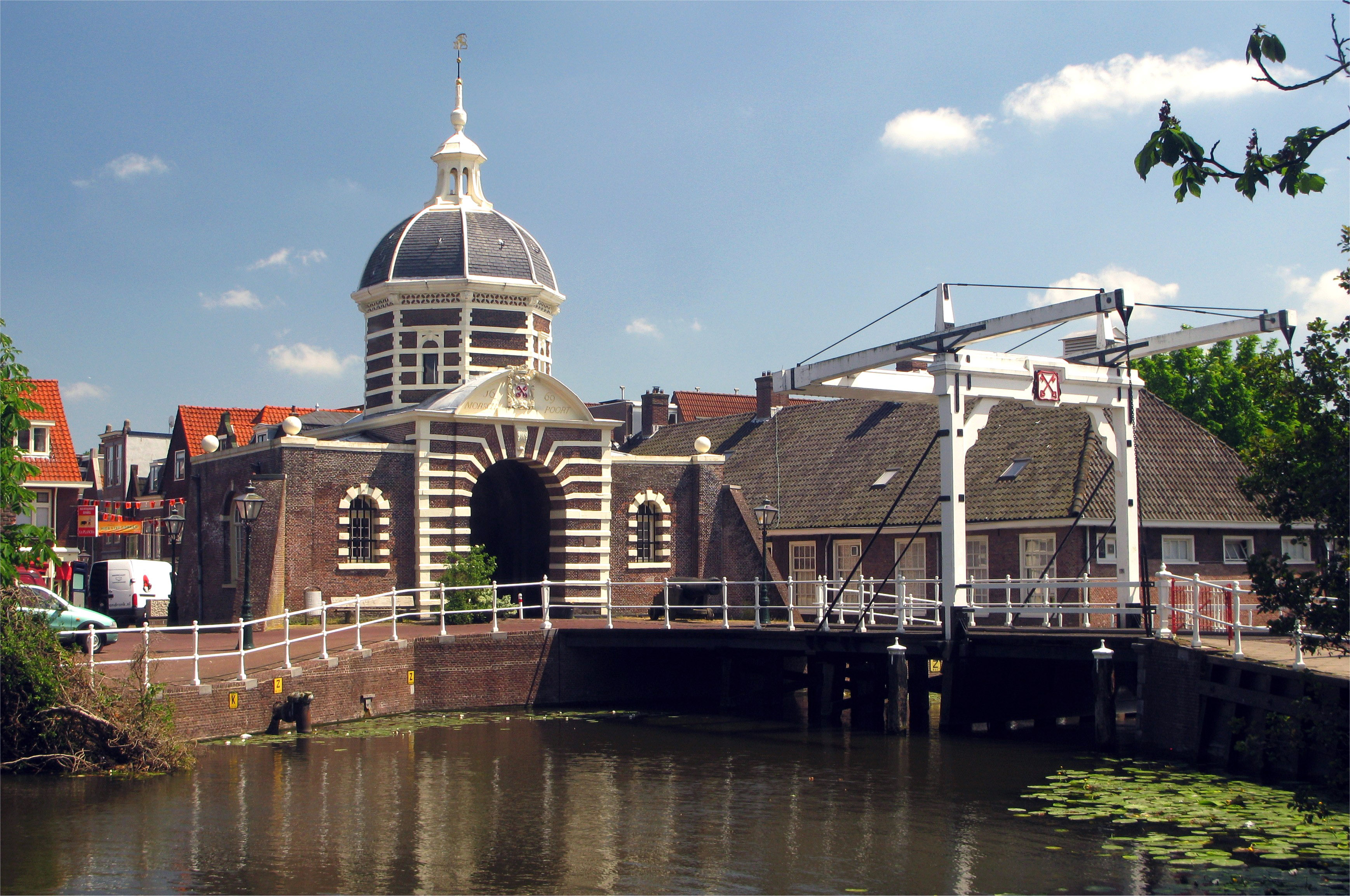

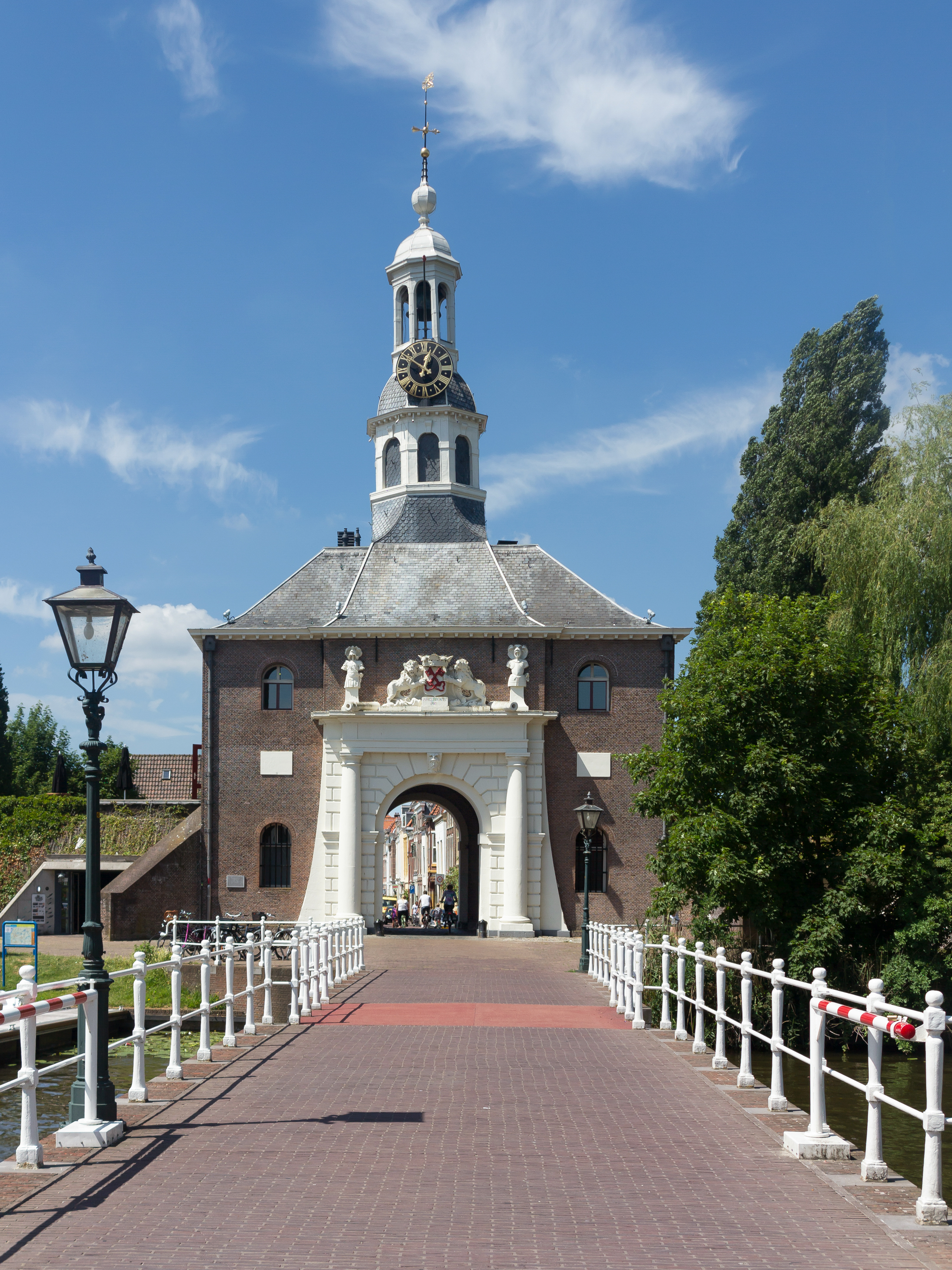

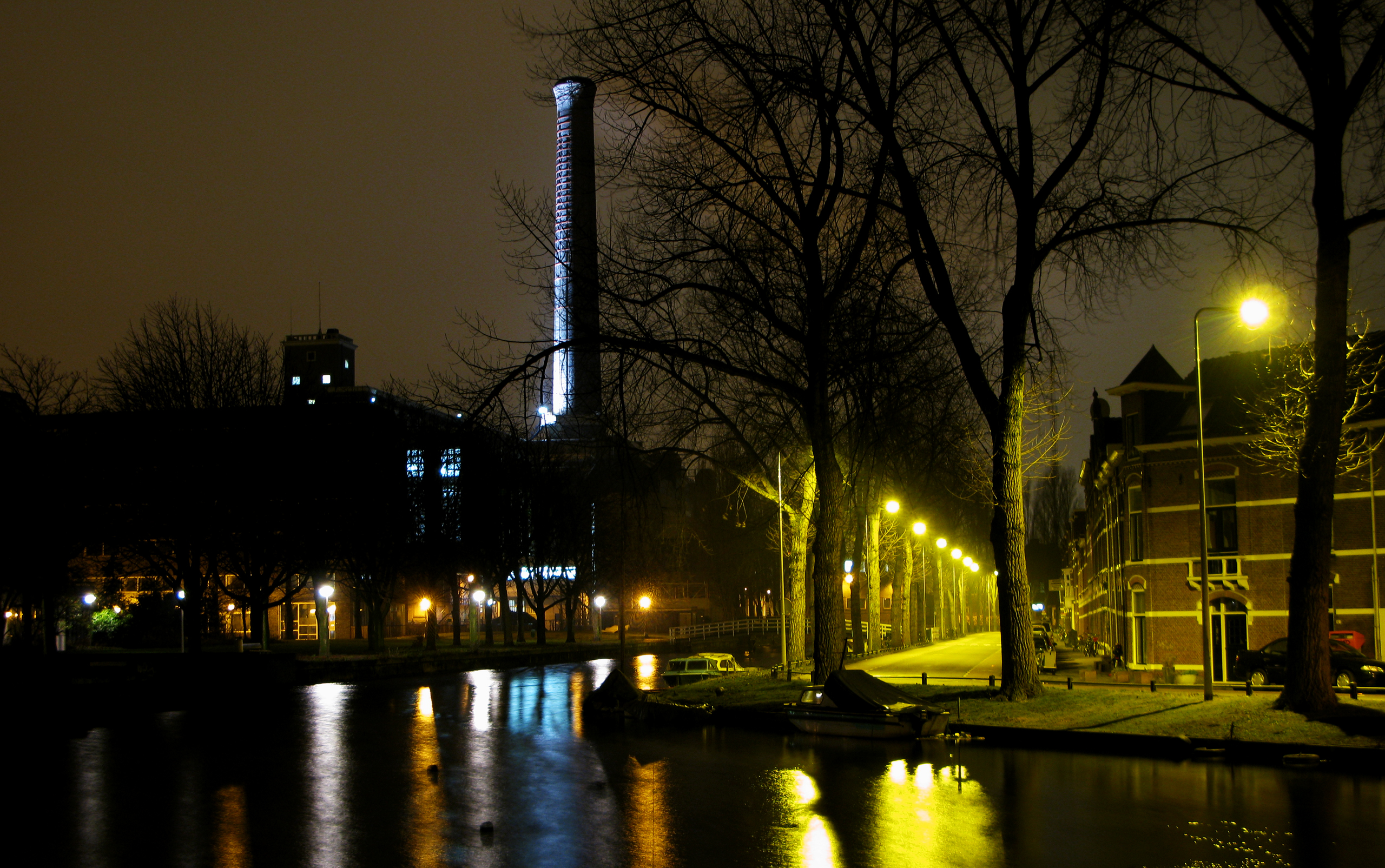

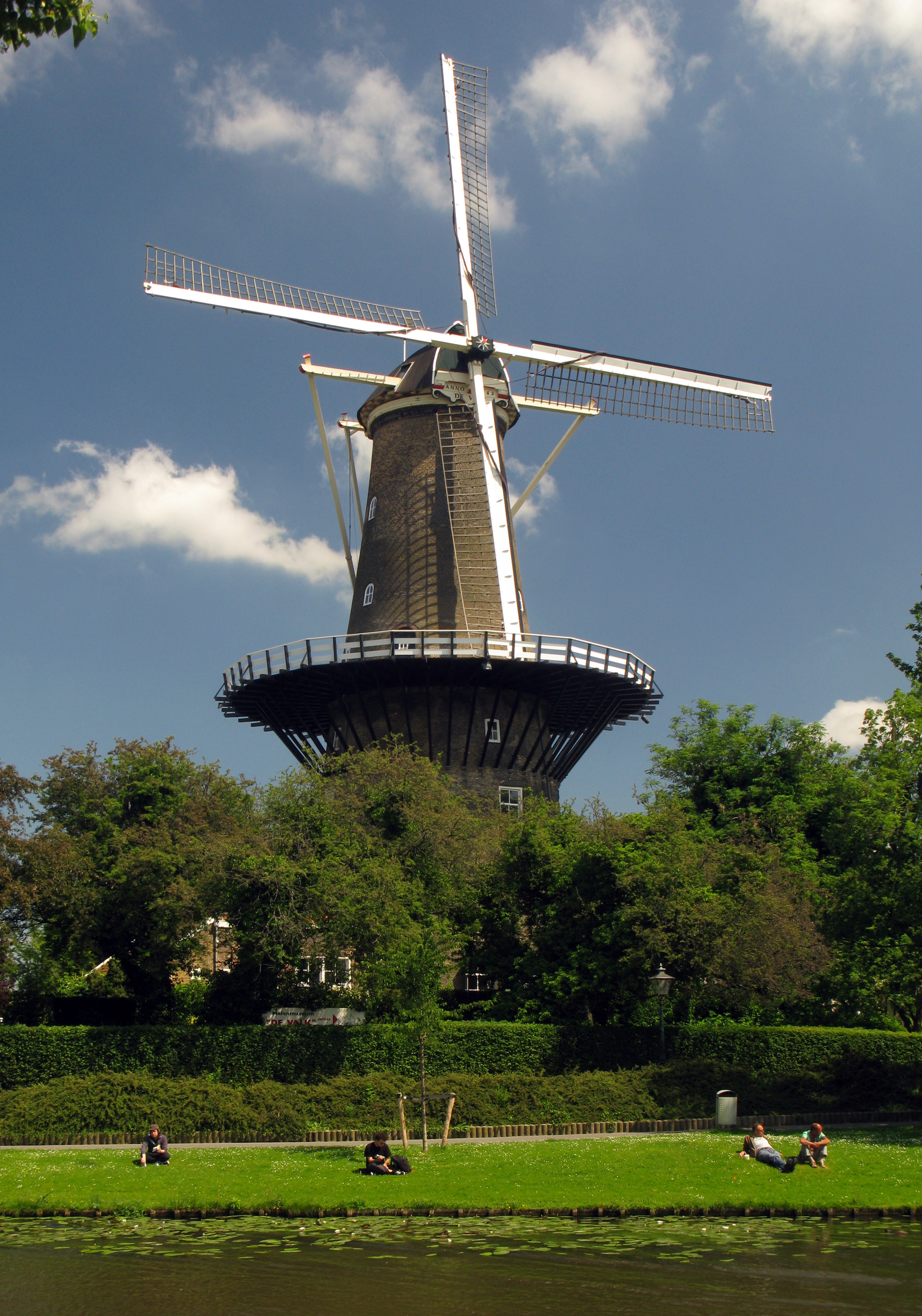

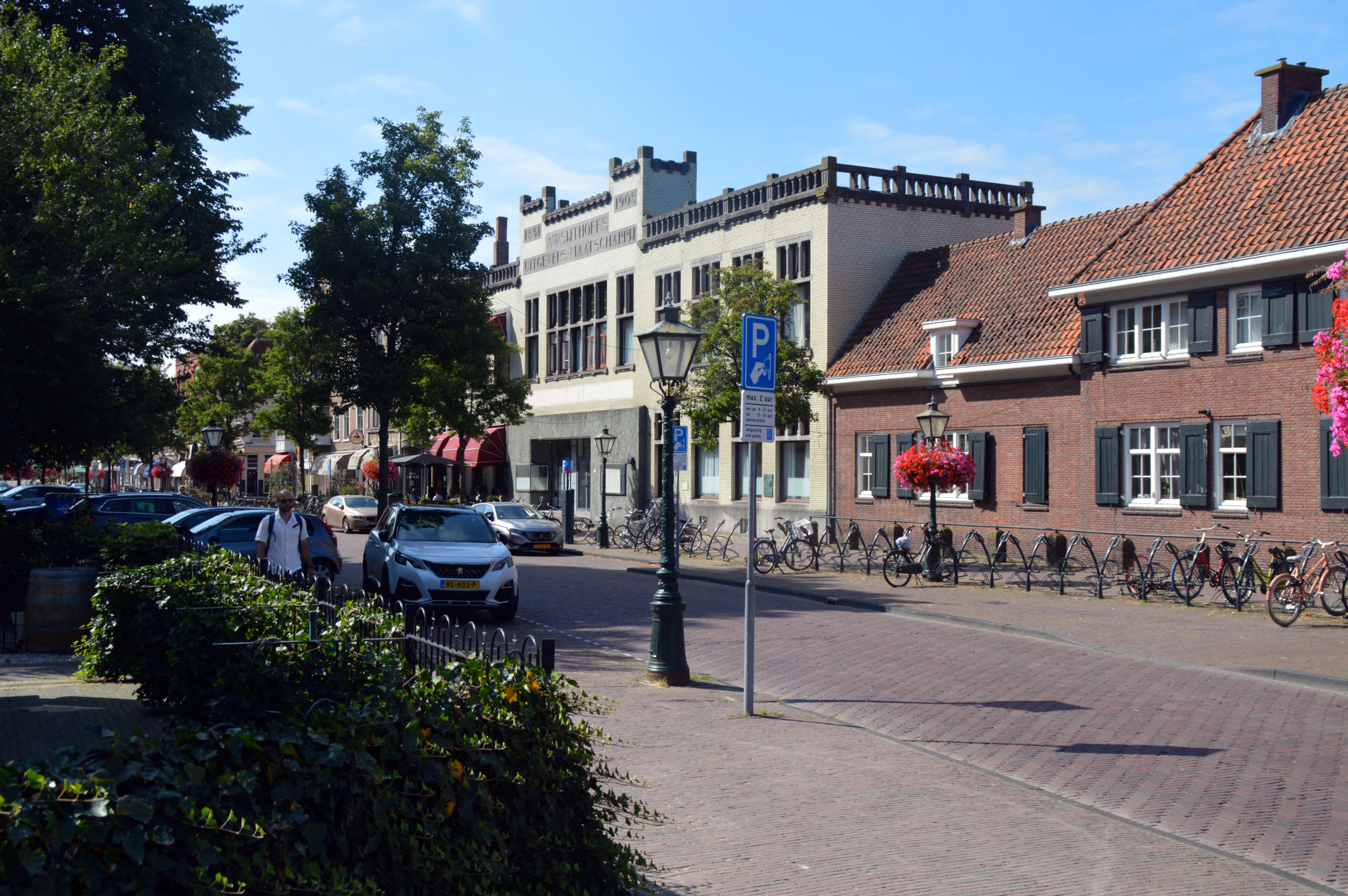

=== Fortifications ===
At the strategically important junction of the two arms of the Oude Rijn stands the old castle de Burcht, a circular tower built on an earthen mound. The mound probably was a refuge against high water before a small wooden fortress was built on top of it in the 11th century. The citadel is a so-called motte-and-bailey castle. Of Leiden's old city gates only two are left, the Zijlpoort and the Morspoort, both dating from the end of the 17th century. Apart from one small watch tower on the Singel nothing is left of the town's city walls. Another former fortification is the Gravensteen. Built as a fortress in the 13th century it has since served as house, library and prison. Presently it is one of the university's buildings.

=== Churches ===
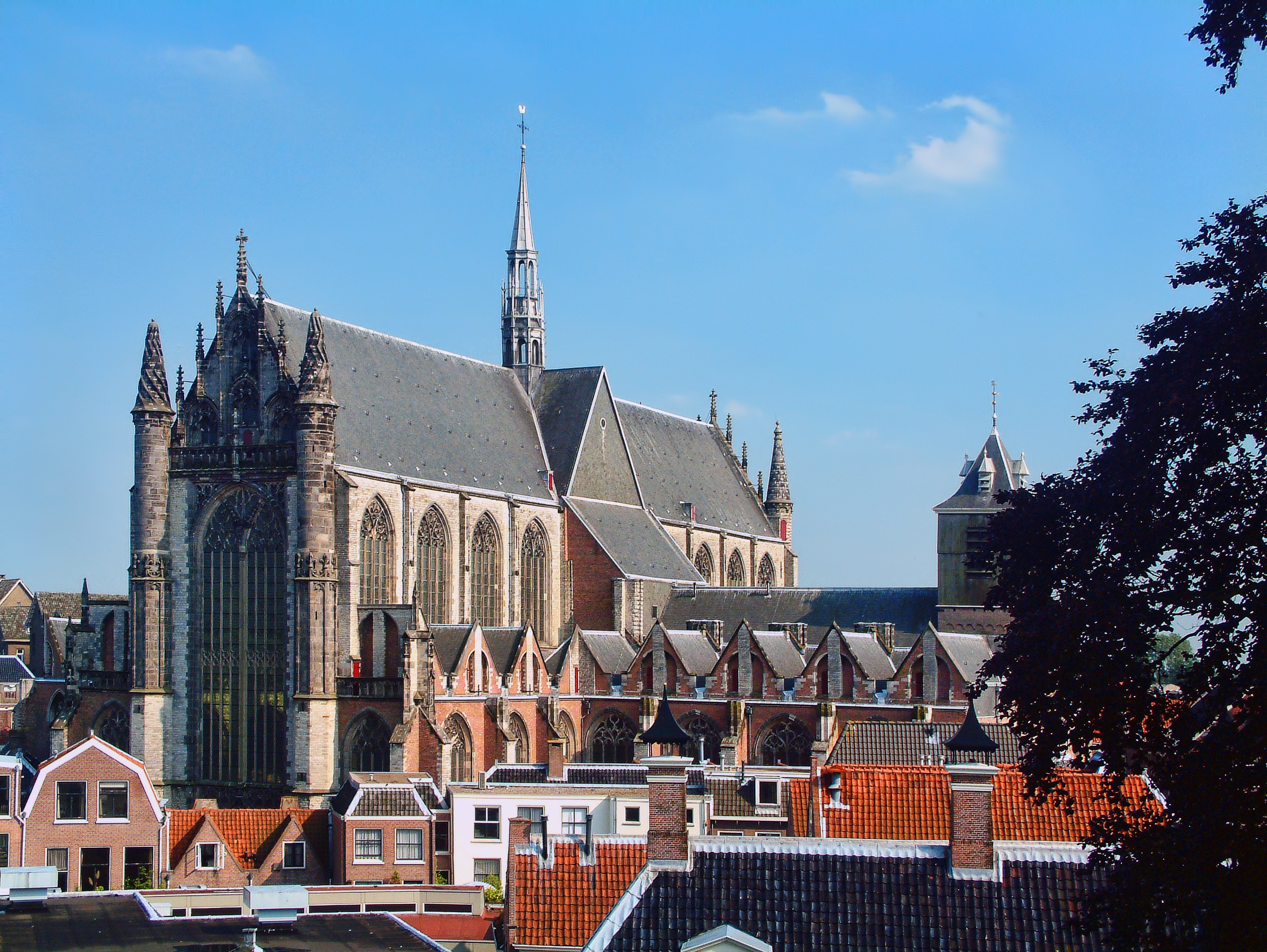

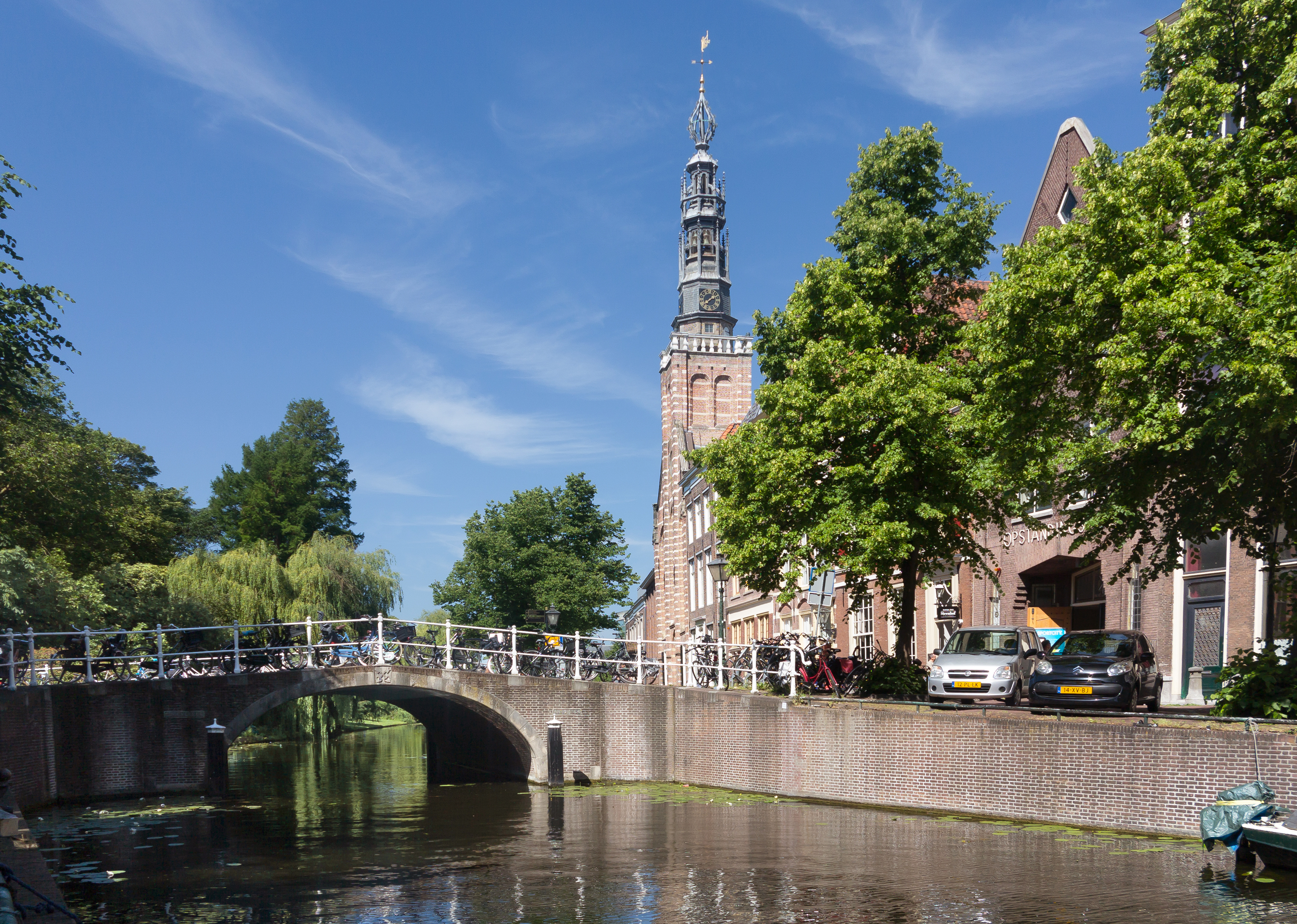

The chief of Leiden's numerous churches are the Hooglandse Kerk (or the church of St Pancras, built in the 15th century and containing a monument to Pieter Adriaansz. van der Werff) and the Pieterskerk (church of St Peter (1315)) with monuments to Scaliger, Boerhaave and other scholars. From a historical perspective the Marekerk is interesting too. Arent van 's Gravesande designed that church in 1639. Other fine examples of his work in Leiden are in the Stedelijk Museum De Lakenhal (the municipal museum of fine arts), and the Bibliotheca Thysiana. The growing city needed another church and the Marekerk was the first Protestant church to be built in Leiden (and in Holland) after the Reformation. It is an example of Dutch Classicism. In the drawings by Van 's Gravesande the pulpit is the centrepiece of the church. The pulpit is modelled after the one in the Nieuwe Kerk at Haarlem (designed by Jacob van Campen). The building was first used in 1650, and is still in use. The Heilige Lodewijkkerk is first catholic church in Leiden that was built after the Reformation. This church was given to the Catholics after the gunpowder explosion in 1807, which killed 150 inhabitants and destroyed a large part of the city centre. The 'Waalse Kerk' (Breestraat 63) was originally part of the Katharina Hospital. In 1584 it became the church of Protestant refugees from the Southern Netherlands (Brugge) and France. Later churches in the centre include the St. Joseph in expressionistic style.

=== University buildings ===
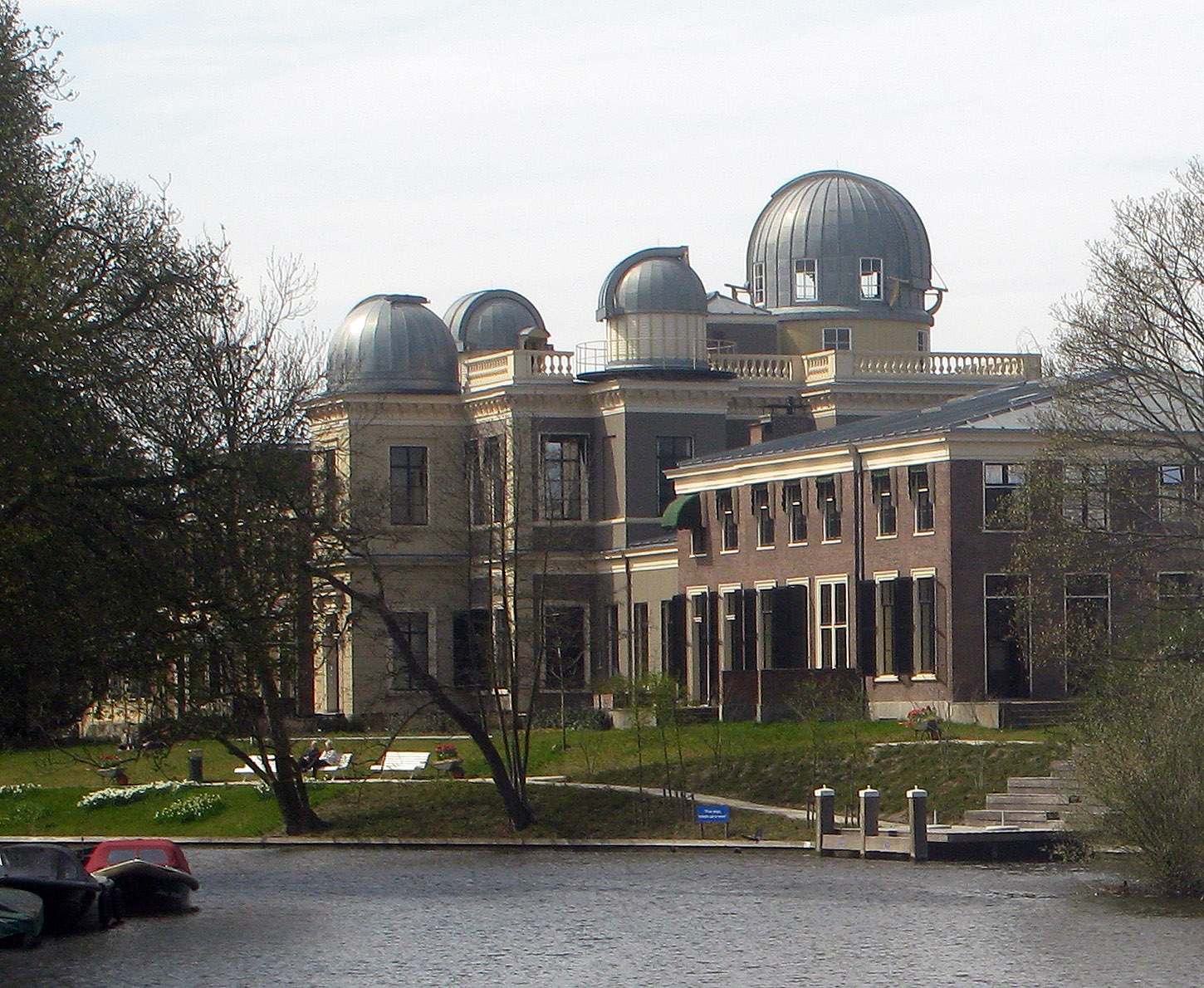
The 1860 Leiden Observatory, after restoration (2013)

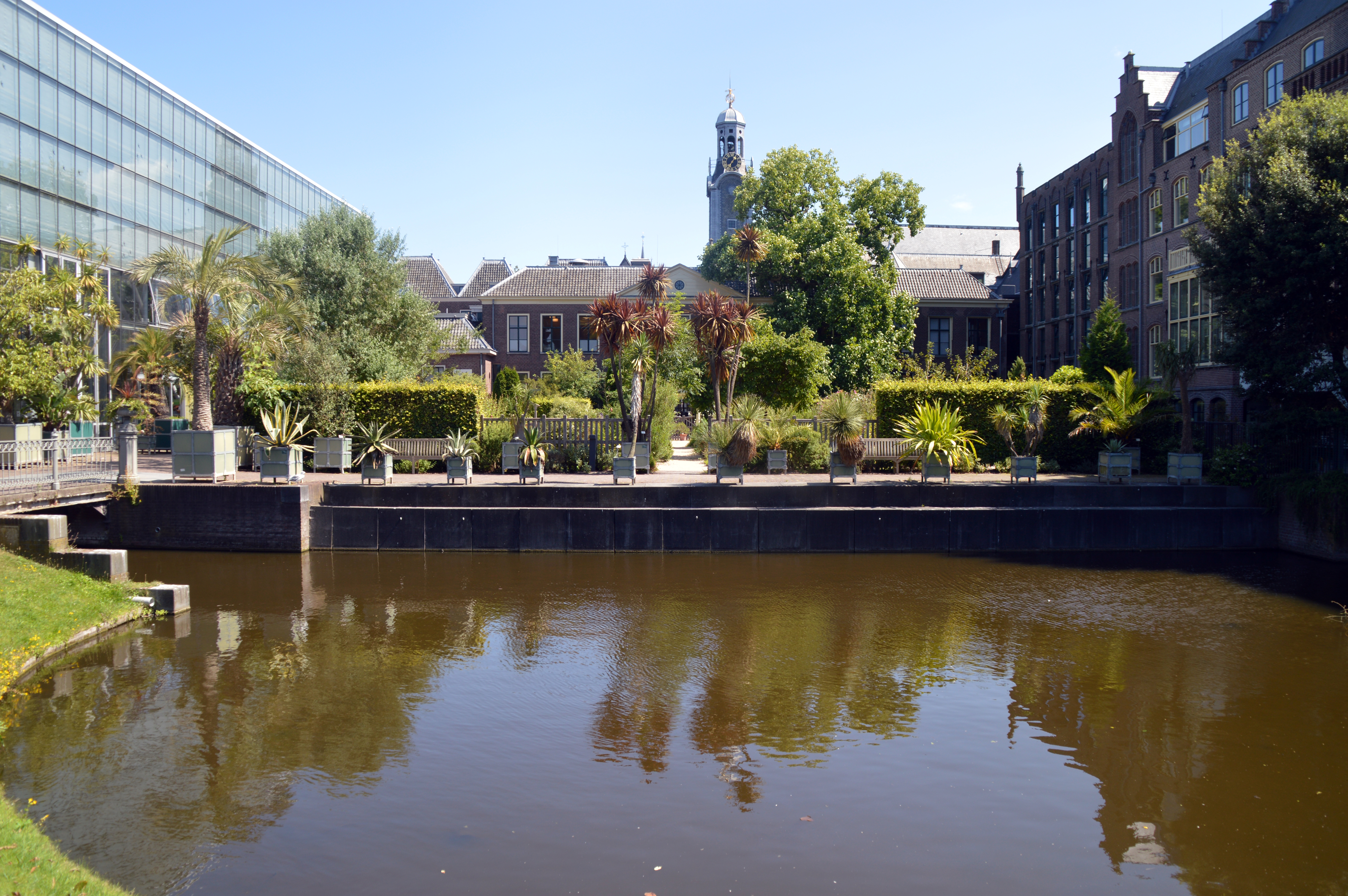
Botanical gardens

The city centre contains many buildings that are in use by the University of Leiden. The Academy Building is housed in a former 16th-century convent. Among the institutions connected with the university are the national institution for East Indian languages, ethnology and geography; the botanical gardens, founded in 1587; the observatory (1860); the museum of antiquities (Rijksmuseum van Oudheden); and the ethnographical museum, of which P. F. von Siebold's Japanese collection was the nucleus (Rijksmuseum voor Volkenkunde). This collection is now housed in a separate museum called the SieboldHuis. The Bibliotheca Thysiana occupies an old Renaissance building of the year 1655. It is especially rich in legal works and vernacular chronicles. Noteworthy are also the many special collections at Leiden University Library among which those of the Society of Dutch Literature (1766) and the collection of casts and engravings. In recent years the university has built the Leiden Bio Science Park at the city's outskirts to accommodate the Science departments.

=== Other buildings ===
- Stadhuis (City Hall), a 16th-century building that was badly damaged by a fire in 1929 but has its Renaissance façade designed by Lieven de Key still standing
- Gemeenlandshuis van Rijnland (1596, restored in 1878)
- De Waag (English: weigh house), built by Pieter Post
- Gravensteen – a former 15th century jail at the Gerecht square (former court-house)
- Stedelijk Gymnasium (aka Latijnse School) – the old gymnasium (1599)
- Heilige Geest Weeshuis (a former Holy Spirit Orphanage) – a complex of 16th-century buildings.
- Molen de Valk – a corn-grinding windmill, now home to a museum (1743)
- Pesthuis, which was built during 1657–1661 at that time just outside the city for curing patients suffering the bubonic plague. However, after it was built the feared disease did not occur in the Netherlands anymore so it was never used for its original purpose. The building has been used as a military hospital, prison, national asylum and army museum. Until 2019, it served as the entrance of Naturalis. This museum, one of the largest natural history museums in the world, was recently renovated and is a building of interest in itself.
- Stadstimmerwerf – the city carpenter's yard or construction yard (1612), built by Lieven de Key (c. 1560–1627). The former residence of the city's master carpenter is open to the public and is in use as an art gallery of a local visual artists collective.

== Culture ==
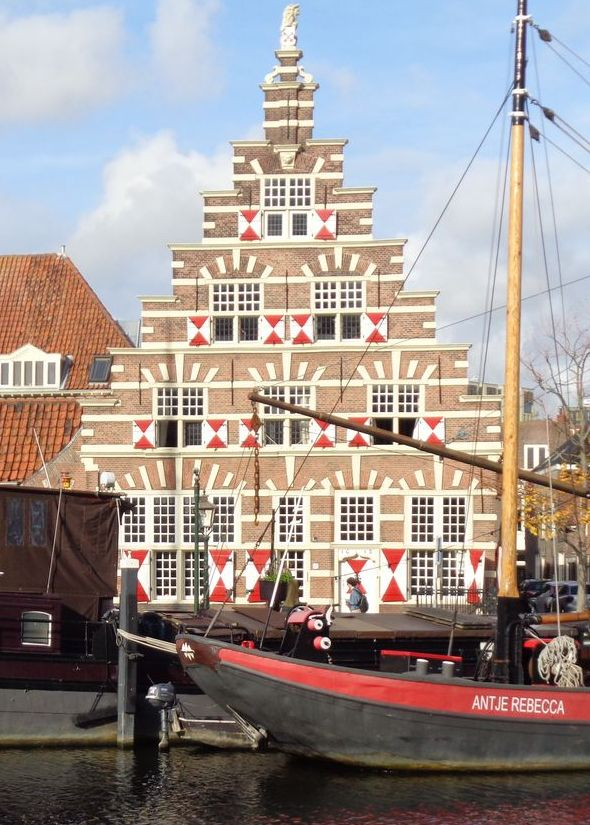
The former residence of Leiden's master carpenter at the Stadstimmerwerf (city carpenter's or construction yard), open to the public and in use as an art gallery.

=== Museums ===
- Rijksmuseum van Oudheden (National Museum of Antiquities)
- Museum Volkenkunde (National Museum of Ethnology)
- Naturalis Biodiversity Center
- Rijksmuseum Boerhaave
- Stedelijk Museum de Lakenhal
- Japan Museum Sieboldhuis
- Museum de Valk
- Leiden American Pilgrim Museum
- Corpus (in Oegstgeest, but almost directly next to the border with Leiden)
- Hortus Botanicus Leiden
- Museum Het Leids Weverhuis
- Young Rembrandt Studio
- Erfgoed Leiden en Omstreken
- Anatomisch Museum Leiden

== Transport ==
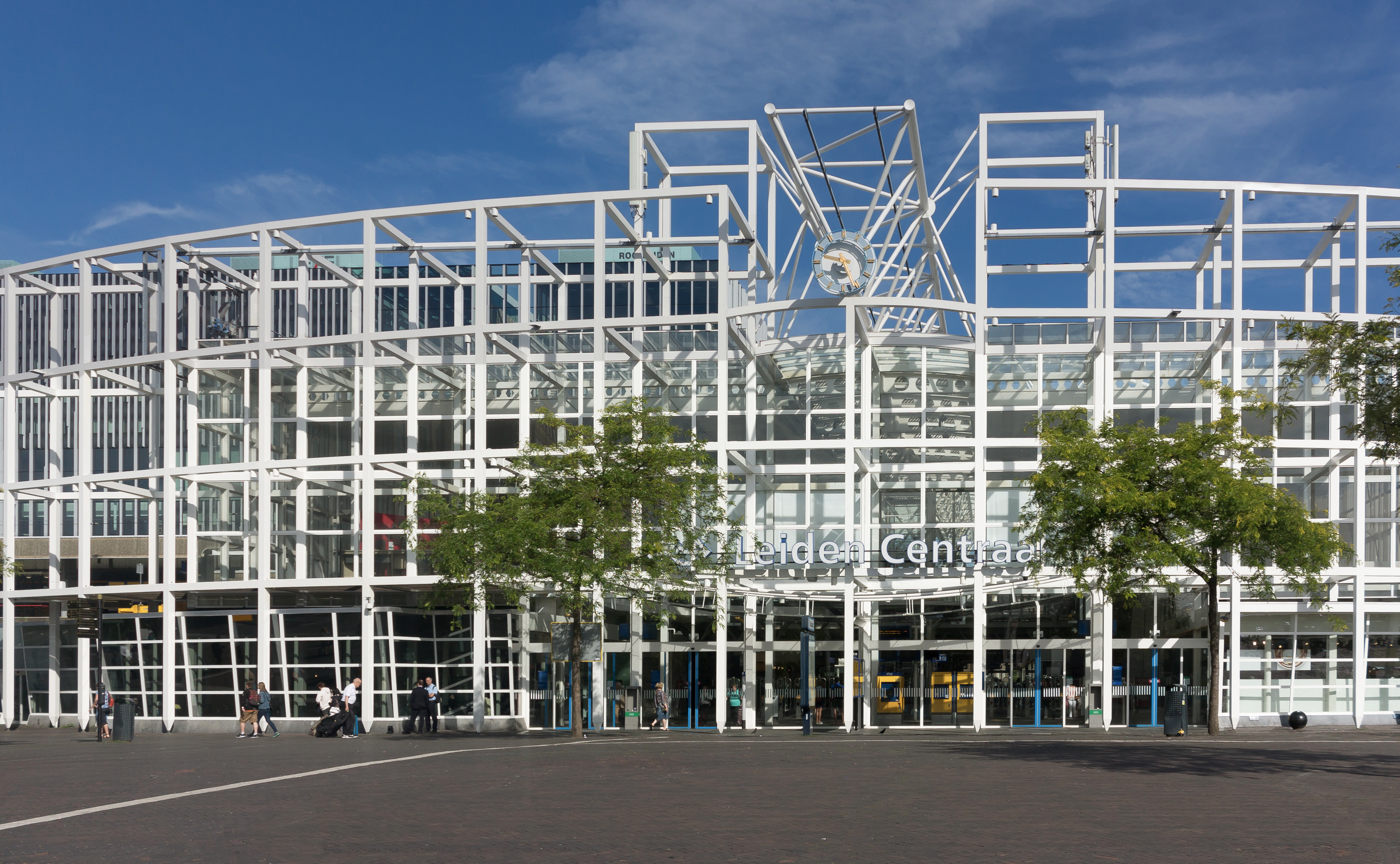
Leiden, central railway station

Local bus service in Leiden is provided by Qbuzz under contract to the province of Zuid-Holland. Qbuzz took over the service from Arriva in December 2024.

Leiden has three intercity railway stations: Leiden Centraal, Leiden Lammenschans, and De Vink. Nederlandse Spoorwegen provides rail service to all three stations.

Air travel is served by the nearest Schiphol Airport which is approximately 31 km northeast of Leiden. NS operates direct train services between Leiden Centraal and Schiphol stations.

== Notable people ==
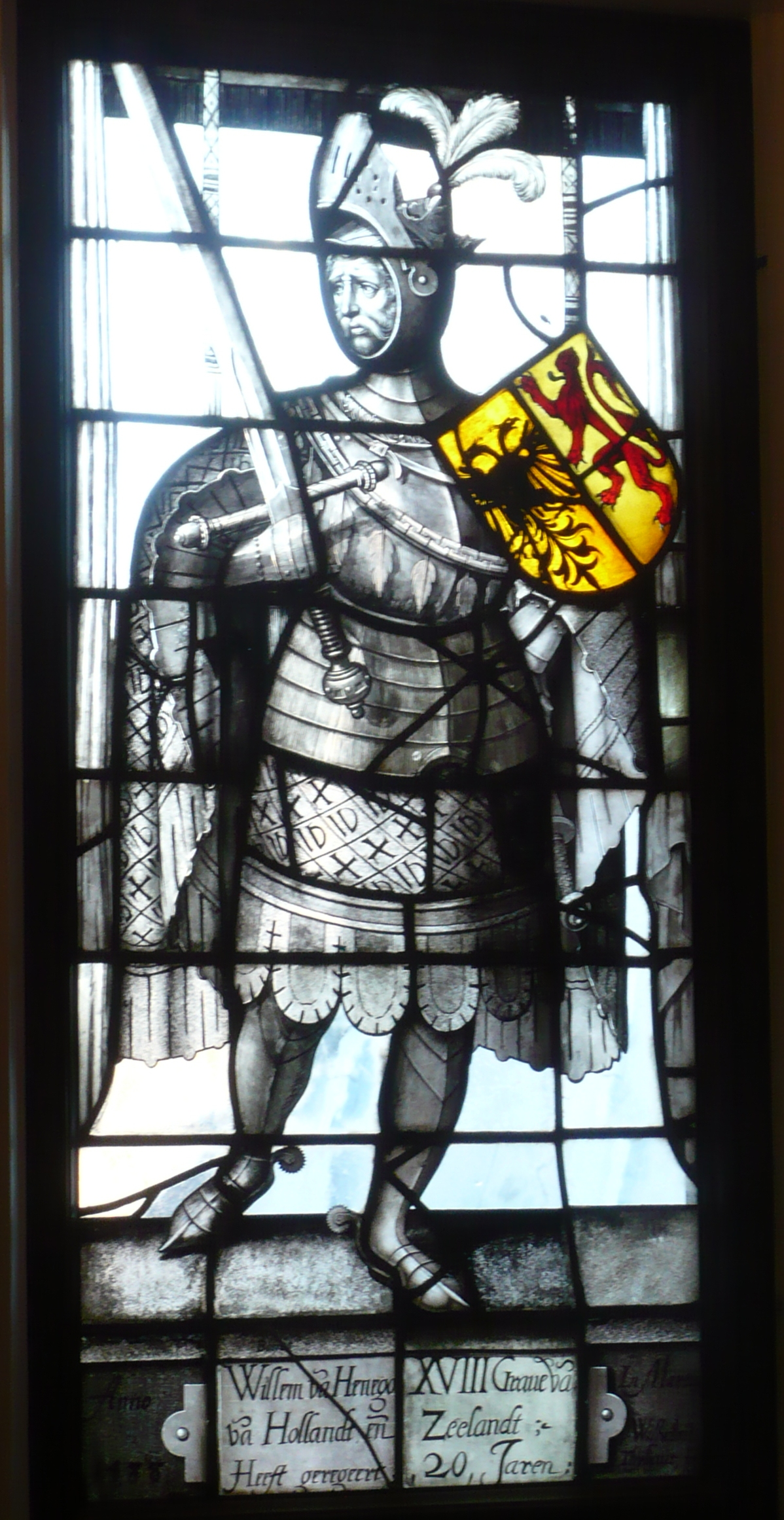
William II, Count of Holland in the Lakenhal

The following is a selection of important Leidenaren throughout history:

=== Public officials and scholars ===
Historical population
Year	Pop.	±% p.a.
1398	5,000	—
1497	11,000	+0.80%
1514	14,250	+1.53%
1574	12,456	−0.22%
1581	12,144	−0.36%
1622	44,745	+3.23%
1632	44,000	−0.17%
1665	67,000	+1.28%
1732	70,000	+0.07%
1750	38,105	−3.32%
1795	30,955	−0.46%
Source: Lourens & Lucassen 1997, pp. 112–114

- William II, Count of Holland (1228–1256), Count of Holland 1234-1256
- Floris V, Count of Holland (1254–1296), Count of Holland and Zeeland 1256–1296
- John of Leiden (1509–1536), leader of the Anabaptist Münster Rebellion
- William Brewster (1568–1644), pilgrim, Mayflower passenger in 1620
- Daniel Heinsius (1580–1655), scholar of the Dutch Renaissance
- William Bradford (1590–1657), pilgrim, leader of the American Plymouth Colony in Massachusetts
- Franciscus Junius (1591–1677), pioneer of Germanic philology
- Isaac Elzevir (1596–1651), Dutch publisher and printer, co-founder of House of Elzevir
- Love Brewster (1611–1650/1), pilgrim and founder of Bridgewater, Massachusetts
- Isaac Vossius (1618–1689), scholar, manuscript collector and Canon at Windsor Castle
- Nicolaas Heinsius the Elder (1620–1681), Dutch classical scholar and poet
- Johann Bachstrom (1688–1742), writer, scientist and Lutheran theologian
- Gottfried, Freiherr van Swieten (1733–1803), diplomat, friend and patron of several great composers
- Jan Bake (1787–1864), Dutch philologist and critic
- Reinhart Dozy (1820–1883), Dutch scholar of Arabic of Huguenot origin
- Cornelis Tiele (1830–1902), Dutch theologian and scholar
- J. P. B. de Josselin de Jong (1886–1964), museum curator, founding father of modern Dutch anthropology and structural anthropology
- Hans de Koster (1914–1992), Dutch politician, diplomat and businessman
- Twins Alfred Kossmann (1922–1998), poet and prose writer and Ernst Kossmann (1922–2003), historian
- Leendert Ginjaar (1928–2003), Dutch politician and chemist
- Laurens Jan Brinkhorst (born 1937), retired Dutch politician and diplomat
- Ankie Broekers-Knol (born 1946), Dutch politician, jurist and Minister
- Carel Stolker (born 1954), rector magnificus and president of Leiden University from 2013 until 2021
- Princess Laurentien of the Netherlands (born 1966), wife of Prince Constantijn
- Kajsa Ollongren (born 1967), Dutch-Swedish politician, Deputy Prime Minister of the Netherlands
- Julius Terpstra (born 1989), Dutch politician

=== The arts ===
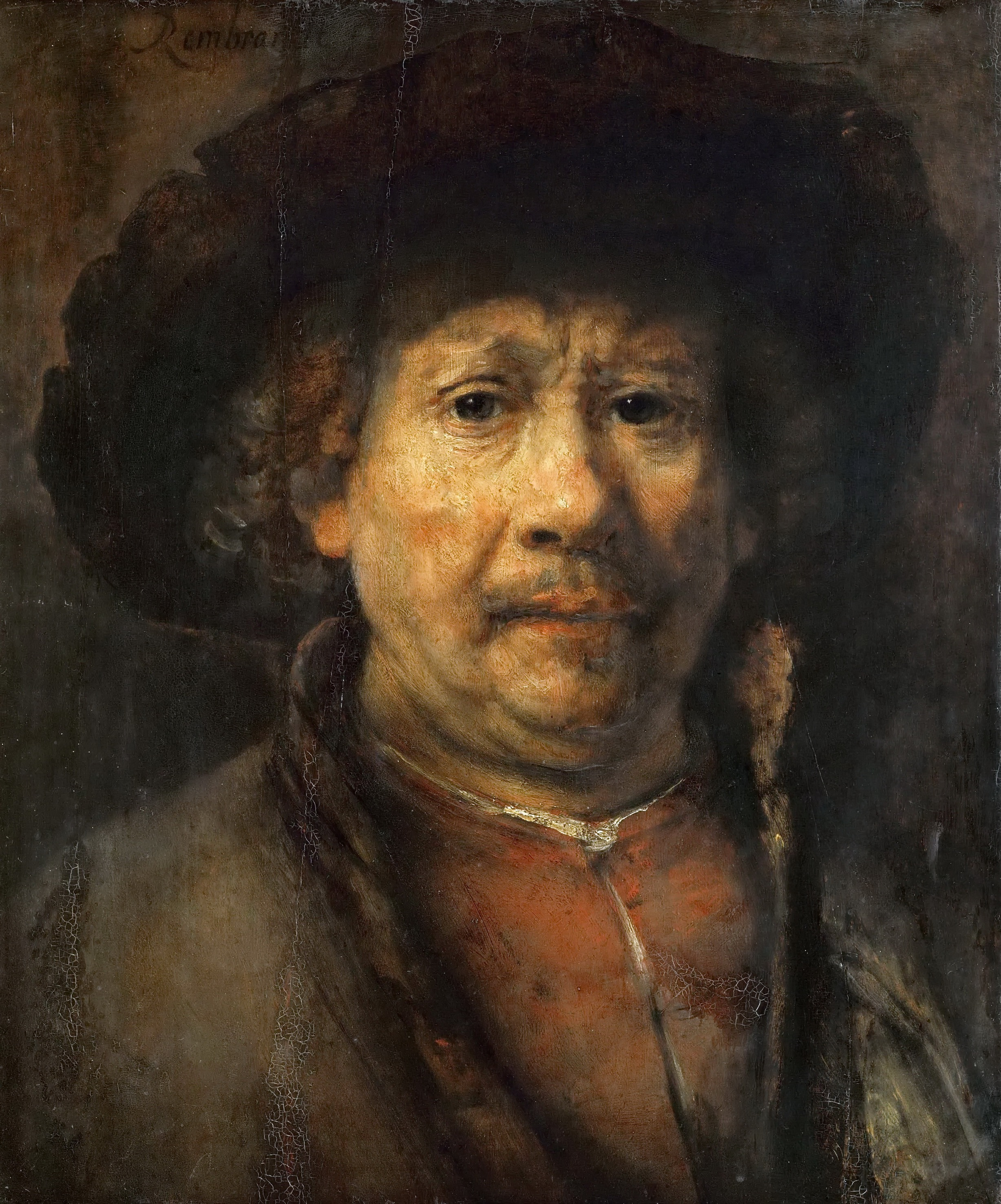
Rembrandt van Rijn, c. 1655

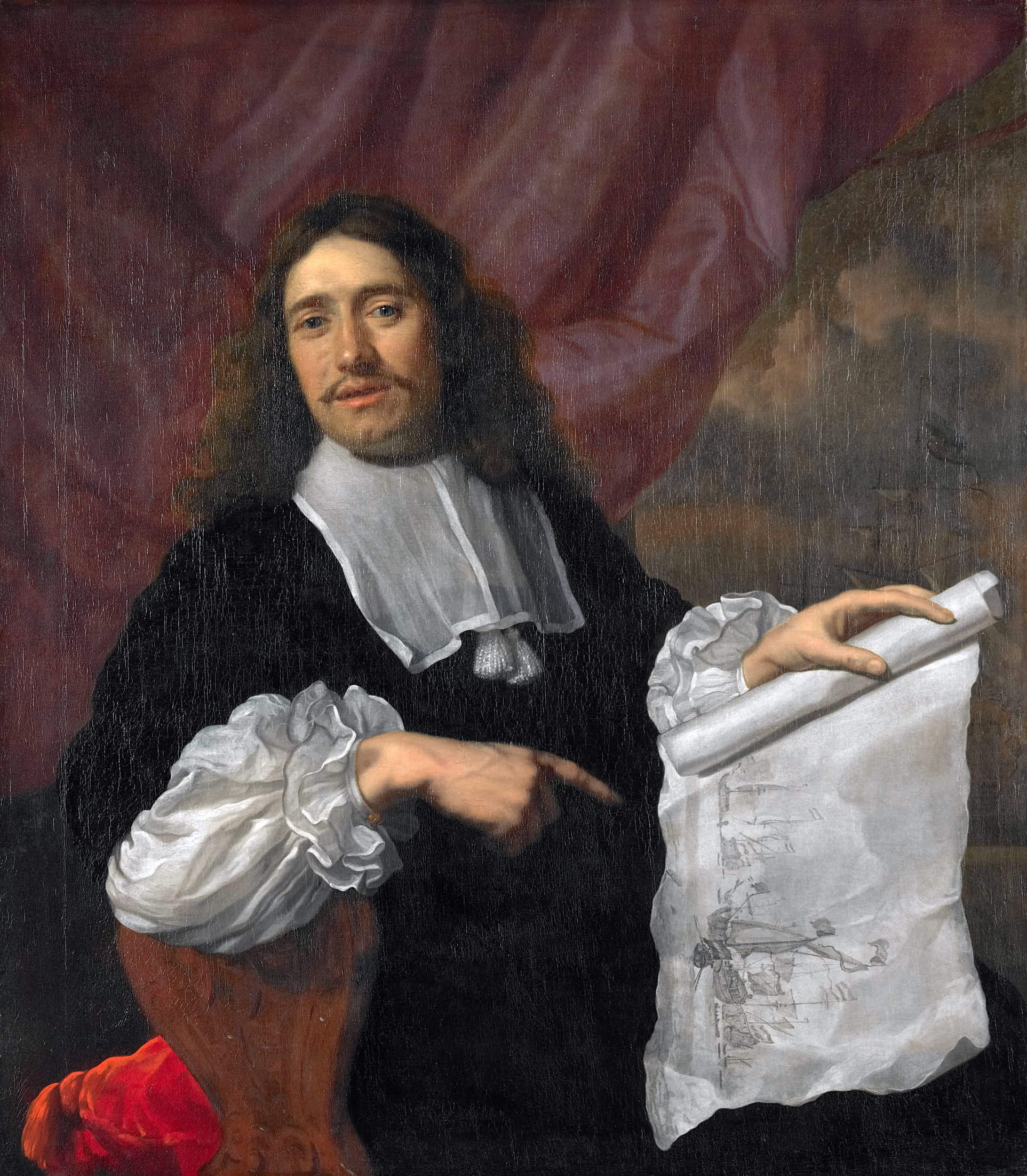
Willem van de Velde II, c. 1660)

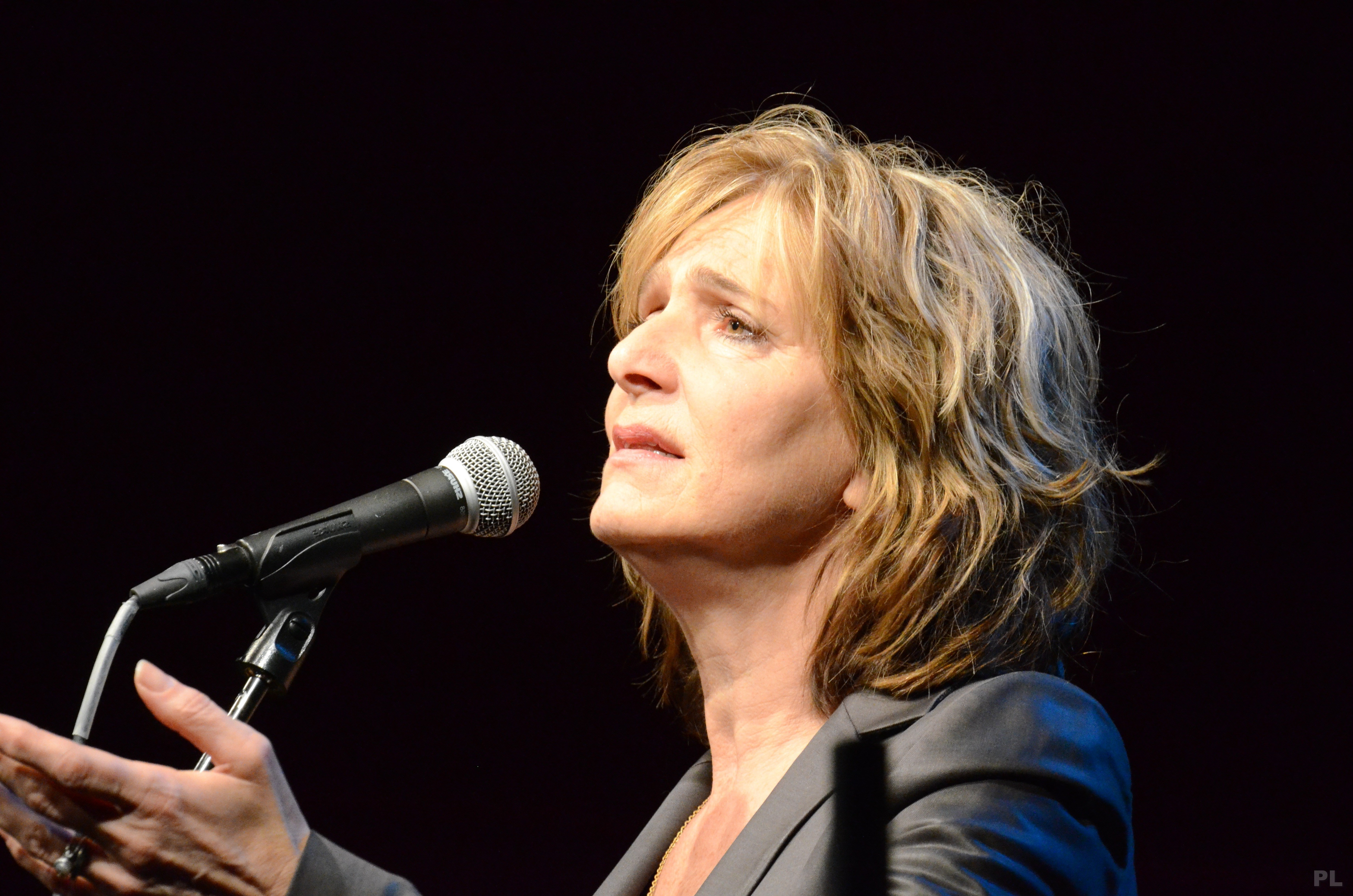
Leoni Jansen, 2013

- Cornelis Engebrechtsz. (c. 1462–1527), early Dutch painter
- Lucas van Leyden (1494–1533), Dutch painter and printmaker in engraving and woodcut
- Jan van Goyen (1596–1656), Dutch landscape painter
- Justus van Egmont (1601–1674), painter and tapestry designer
- Rembrandt van Rijn (1606– 1669), Dutch draughtsman, painter and printmaker
- Willem van de Velde the Elder (1610/11–1693), Dutch Golden Age seascape painter
- Frans Post (1612–1680), Dutch Golden Age painter
- Gerard Dou (1613–1675), Dutch Golden Age painter
- Jan Steen (c. 1626–1679), Dutch Golden Age genre painter
- Gabriel Metsu (1629–1667), painter of history paintings, still life, portraits and genre works
- Willem van de Velde the Younger (1633-1707), Dutch marine painter
- Frans van Mieris the Elder (1635–1681) Dutch Golden Age genre and portrait painter
- Jan Gaykema Jacobsz. (1798–1875), Dutch painter, draughtsman and botanical illustrator
- Jan Elias Kikkert (1843–1925), Dutch lithographer and watercolorist of street scenes of Leiden
- Coenraad V. Bos (1875–1955), Dutch pianist, an accompanist to singers of lieder
- Louise Beijerman (1883-1970), Dutch sculptor
- Theo van Doesburg (1883–1931), Dutch artist, founder and leader of De Stijl
- Ernst Winar (1894–1978), Dutch actor and film director
- Nina Foch (1924–2008), Dutch American actress and drama teacher
- Michel Waisvisz (1949–2008), Dutch composer, performer, inventor of experimental electronic musical instruments and artistic director of STEIM 1981-2008
- Leoni Jansen (born 1955), TV personality and anchor-woman, singer and stage-director
- Daniel Reuss (born 1961), Dutch conductor, primarily a choral conductor
- Isa Hoes (born 1967), Dutch actress and voice actress
- Eva Dorrepaal (born 1970), Dutch actress
- Armin van Buuren (born 1976), Dutch DJ, record producer and remixer
- Carice van Houten (born 1976), Dutch actress and singer
- Dyro (born 1992), Dutch DJ and Electronic dance music producer

=== Science ===
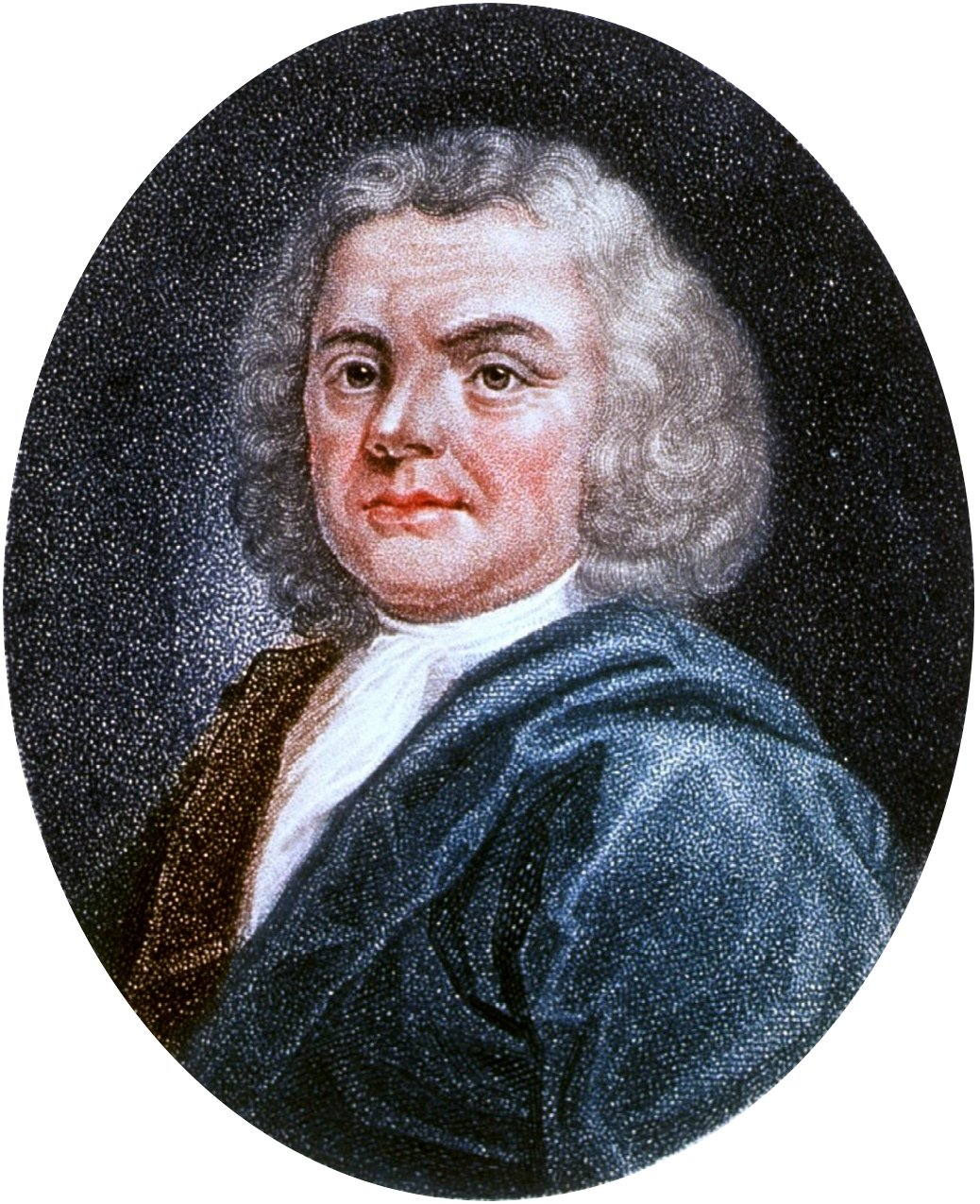
Herman Boerhaave

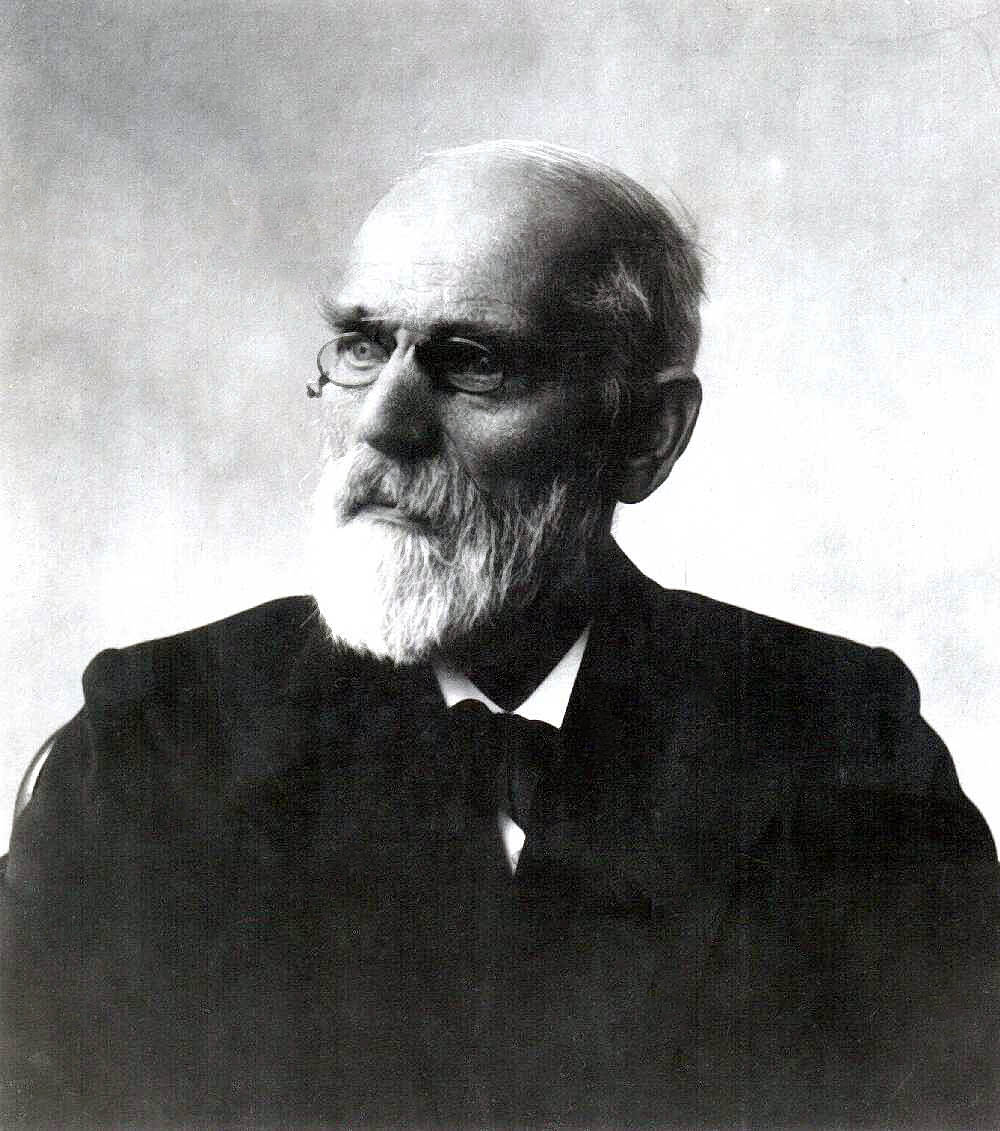
Johannes Diderik van der Waals

- Rembert Dodoens (1517–1585), botanist, died in Leiden
- Charles de L'Écluse (1526–1609), botanist, horticulturist and director of Hortus Botanicus Leiden
- Ludolph van Ceulen (1540–1610), mathematician, computed the number π, pi
- Willebrord Snellius (1580–1626), Dutch astronomer and mathematician
- Herman Boerhaave (1668–1738), botanist, chemist, Christian humanist and physician
- Bernhard Siegfried Albinus (1697–1770), a German-born Dutch anatomist
- Gerard van Swieten (1700–1772), Dutch physician, personal physician of Maria Theresa
- Adriaan van Royen (1704–1779), botanist, born, lived and died in Leiden
- Petrus Camper FRS (1722–1789), Dutch physician, anatomist, physiologist, midwife, zoologist, anthropologist, palaeontologist and a naturalist
- Philipp Franz von Siebold (1796–1866), German physician and botanist, studied Japanese flora and fauna
- Johannes Diderik van der Waals (1837–1923), Dutch theoretical physicist, winner of the 1910 Nobel Prize in Physics
- Hendrik Lorentz (1853–1928), Dutch physicist, joint winner of the 1902 Nobel Prize in Physics
- Heike Kamerlingh Onnes (1853–1926), Dutch physicist and winner of the 1913 Nobel Prize in Physics
- Willem Einthoven (1860–1927), Dutch physician and physiologist
- Pieter Zeeman (1865–1943), Dutch physicist, joint winner of the 1902 Nobel Prize in Physics
- Willem de Sitter (1872–1934), Dutch mathematician, physicist and astronomer
- Albert Einstein (1879–1955), lecturer/researcher at Leiden University, variously between 1916 and 1930
- Paul Ehrenfest (1880–1933), Austrian/Dutch theoretical physicist, contributed to statistical mechanics
- Geertruida de Haas-Lorentz (1885–1973), female Dutch physicist, worked on Brownian motion and electrical noise theory
- Jan Oort (1900–1992), Dutch astronomer, pioneer in radio astronomy
- Hendrik Casimir (1909–2000), Dutch physicist
- Ewine van Dishoeck (born 1955), Dutch astronomer, chemist, molecular astrophysicist

=== Sport ===
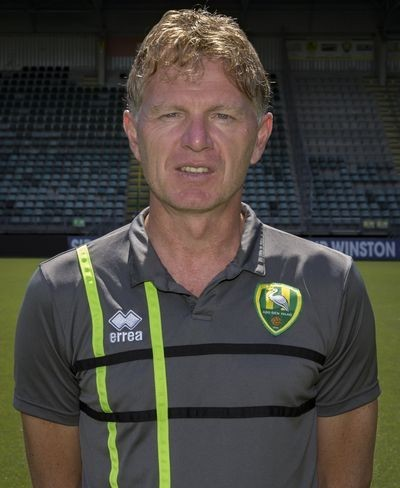
Alfons Groenendijk, 2017

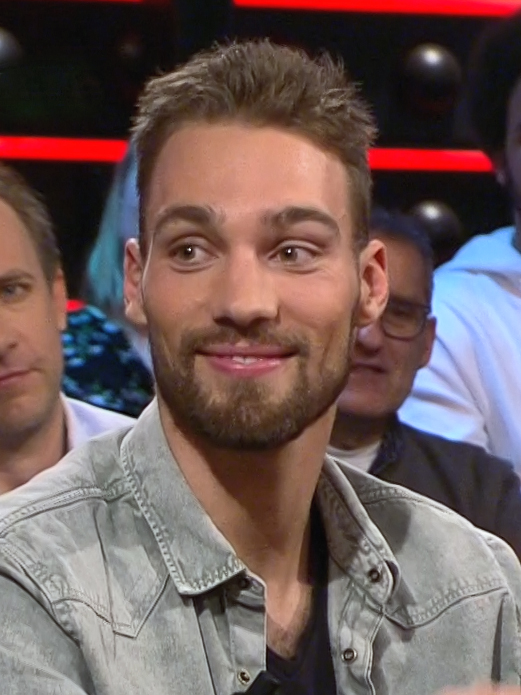
Kjeld Nuis, 2018

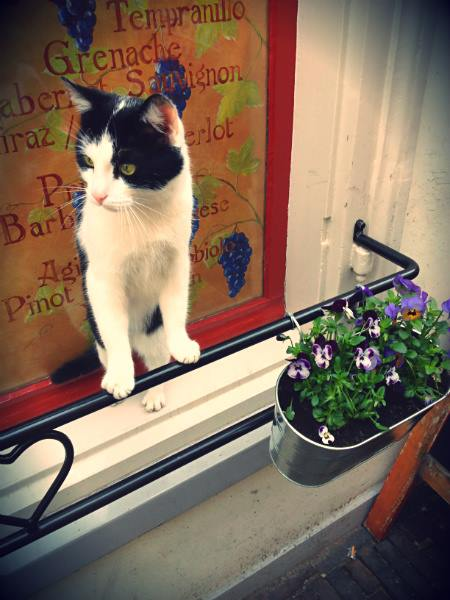
Buurtpoes Bledder

- Willem Slijkhuis (1923–2003), Dutch middle-distance runner, won two bronze medals in the 1948 Summer Olympics
- Sandra Le Poole (born 1959), retired field hockey player, team gold medallist at the 1984 Summer Olympics
- Ronald Florijn (born 1961), former rower, twice team gold medallist, at the 1988 and 1996 Summer Olympics
- Carina Benninga (born 1962) & Taco van den Honert (born 1966), former Dutch field hockey players, team gold medallist at the 1984 Summer Olympics and team bronze medallist at the 1988 Summer Olympics
- Alfons Groenendijk (born 1964), former footballer with 413 club caps and current manager
- Gerritjan Eggenkamp (born 1975), Dutch rower, team silver medallist at the 2004 Summer Olympics
- Rodney Glunder (born 1975), retired kickboxer, mixed martial artist, professional wrestler and boxer
- Tim de Cler (born 1978), Dutch former footballer with 361 club caps
- Erik van den Doel (born 1979), Dutch chess Grandmaster
- Merel Witteveen (born 1985), sailor, team silver medallist at the 2008 Summer Olympics
- Biurakn Hakhverdian (born 1985) & Iefke van Belkum (born 1986)), Dutch water polo players, team gold medallists at the 2008 Summer Olympics
- Gegard Mousasi (born 1985), professional mixed martial artist and former kickboxer of Armenian descent.
- Laurine van Riessen (born 1987), long track speed skater and track cyclist, bronze medallist at the 2010 Winter Olympics
- Kjeld Nuis (born 1989), Dutch speed skater, world record holder and gold medallist at the 2018 Winter Olympics over 1000 metre and 1500 metre
- Chantal de Ridder (born 1989), Dutch football striker, 46 caps with the Netherlands women's national football team
- Esmee Visser (born 1996), long-distance speed skater, gold medallist in the 2018 Winter Olympics in the women's 5000 metres

=== Others ===
- Maria Swanenburg (1839–1915), Dutch serial killer, murdered at least 27 people and suspected of killing more than 90
- Aemilianus van Heel (1907–1938), Franciscan friar who served as a missionary in China
- Marinus van der Lubbe (1909–1934), executed for the Reichstag fire in Berlin in 1933
- Buurtpoes Bledder (2011–2013), male domestic cat, media star for his exploits in the city
- Kirtie Ramdas (born 1980), Dutch television presenter and actress

== International relations ==
=== Twin cities – sister cities ===
Leiden is twinned with:

Buffalo City, Eastern Cape, South Africa; Juigalpa, Chontales, Nicaragua; Krefeld, North Rhine-Westphalia, Germany	Nagasaki, Japan; Oxford, United Kingdom; Toruń, Poland

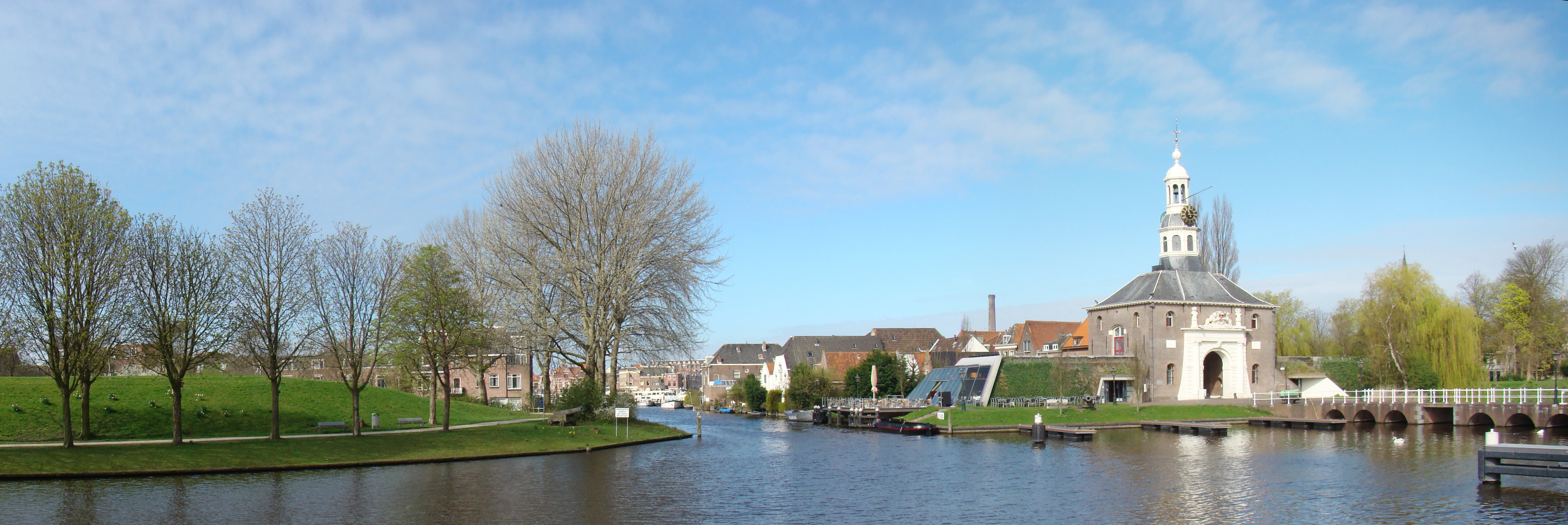
Eastern gate 'Zijlpoort' at the Singel

== Miscellaneous ==
- The coat of arms of Leiden is two red keys, crossed in an X-shape on a white background. These keys are the Keys of Heaven held by St. Peter, for whom a large church in the city centre is named. Because of this coat of arms, Leiden is referred to as the "Sleutelstad" ("the key city").
- For a time Leiden held the title "The Coldest Place on Earth" because of the developments in cryogenics in a laboratory there. Heike Kamerlingh Onnes (1913 Nobel Prize in Physics) liquefied helium for the first time (1908), and later managed to reach a temperature of less than one degree above Absolute zero.
- The Norwegian cheese "nøkkelost" ("key cheese") is named after the keys in coat of arms of Leyden, as it is a variation of Leyden cheese.
- The following places and things are named after this city:
  - Leyden, New York, USA
  - Leyden, Massachusetts, USA
  - Leyden Township, Cook County, Illinois, USA
  - Leiden scale, for measuring extreme low temperatures.
  - Factor V Leiden is named after the city of Leiden where it was discovered in 1994.
  - The Leyden jar, a capacitor made from a glass jar, was invented here by Pieter van Musschenbroek in 1746. It was actually first invented by Ewald Georg von Kleist the year before, but the name "Leyden jar" stuck.
- Leiden's Stadhuis (Town Hall) has a poem in the form of a cryptogram on its façade that records the date 1574 in Roman numerals, the year of the "Black Famine" or Spanish siege (W equals two Vs):

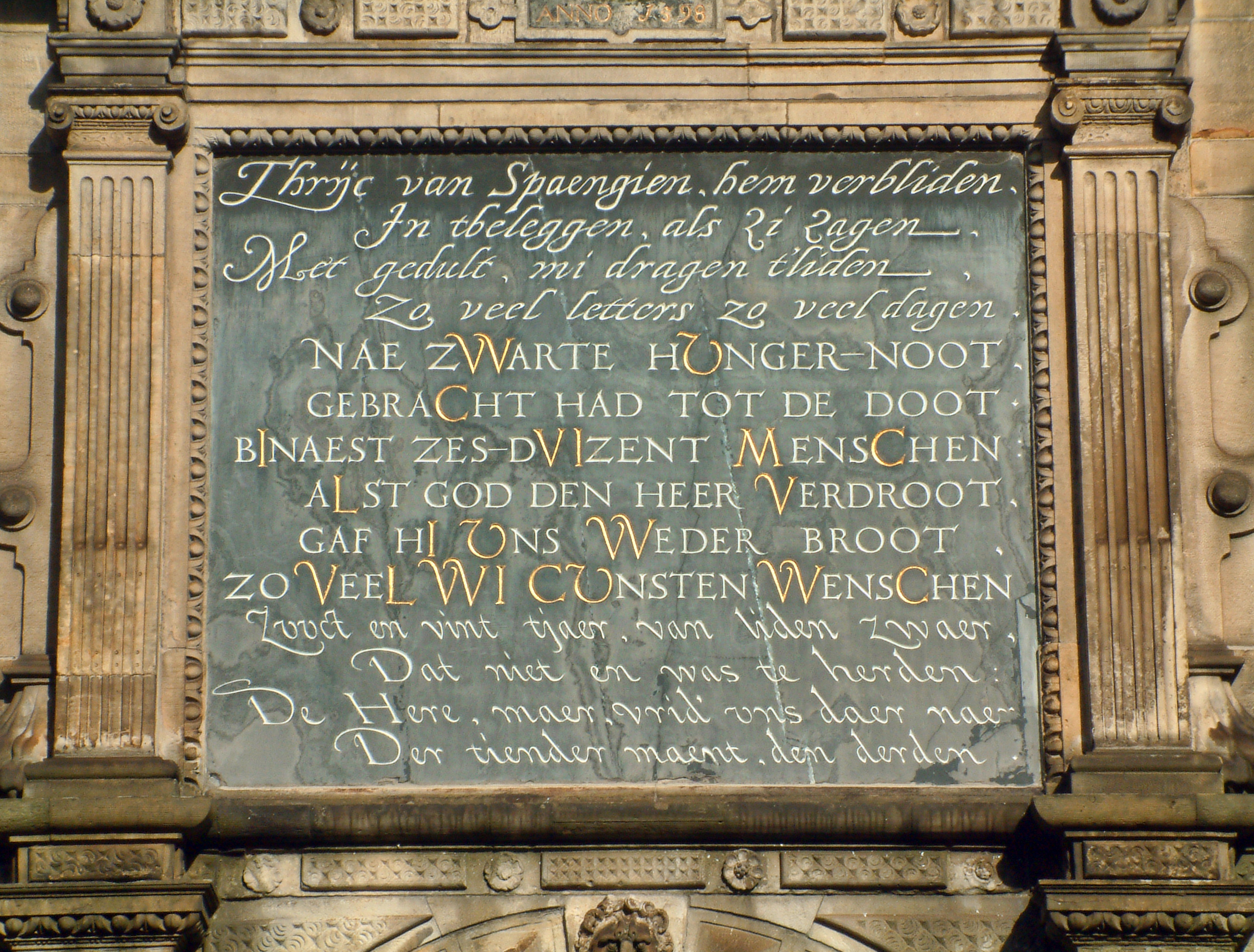
The poem on Leiden's Stadhuis

Nae zWarte HVnger-noot
GebraCht had tot de doot
bInaest zes-dVIzent MensChen;
aLst god den heer Verdroot
gaf hI Vns Weder broot
zo VeeL WI CVnsten WensChen.

(Dutch: "When the Black Famine had brought to the death nearly six thousand persons, then God the Lord repented, and gave bread again as much as we could wish".)

== Sports ==
Zorg en Zekerheid Leiden is the basketball club of Leiden. In 2011, 2013 and 2021 they won the National Title, in 2010 and 2012 the National Cup and in 2011 and 2012 the National Super Cup. The club also played in the FIBA EuroChallenge and reached the Second Round (Best 16) in 2011/2012.

== See also ==
- Leiden Classical A distributed computing project
- Oudt Leyden, former Michelin starred restaurant
- Wireless Leiden
- Zijl
