= Leiden gunpowder disaster =

1807 gunpowder explosion

Coordinates: 52.1558°N 4.4898°E

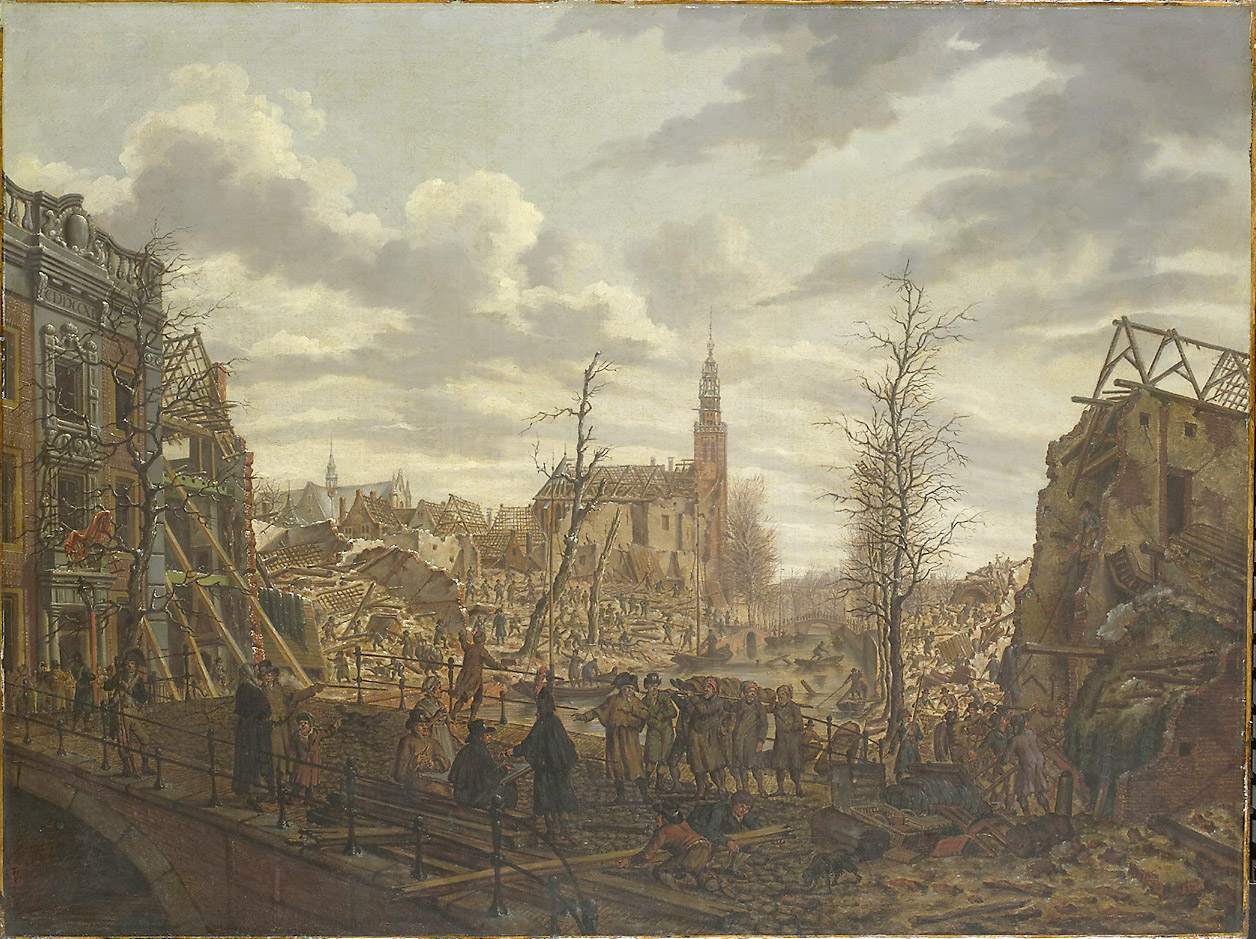
A painting of the explosion's aftermath done by Johannes Jelgerhuis

The Leiden gunpowder disaster occurred on 12 January 1807 when a ship carrying hundreds of barrels of black powder exploded in the Dutch town of Leiden. This catastrophic event resulted in 151 fatalities and the destruction of over 200 buildings.

== Historical background ==
=== Background ===
During the Napoleonic Wars, the Dutch city of Leiden was occupied by the First French Empire. The town—along with the rest of the Netherlands—was reconstituted into the Kingdom of Holland under the rule of Louis Bonaparte. Though ostensibly an independent nation, the new Dutch kingdom was heavily tied to Imperial France and functioned as a political satellite. As a result, the French and Dutch authorities feared that Great Britain and the Fourth Coalition (both of which were preparing for war with France) would invade the Netherlands.

In late 1806, Holland began to stockpile arms and equipment in case of war. In December, an order from the government called for the production of 250,000 pounds of black powder for military use. As the majority of the kingdom's 12 gunpowder factories were located in Amsterdam and Zeeland, it was decided that convoys of civilian ships would be used to transport the vast quantity of explosives around the country; the final destination of the powder was the Dutch Army's arsenal in the town of Delft.

In the first week of January 1807, the government hired three civilian ships to transport the first shipment of powder from Amsterdam to Delft. The captains of all three ships were vetted, and all three had previous experience transporting highly unstable black powder. However, the captain of one of the three ships (the Delfs Welvaaren, translating to Prosperity of Delft City), Adam van Schie, became ill before he set off for Amsterdam. As such, he dispatched his sons Saloman, Adam, and a servant (Jan van Engelen) to captain his ship in his stead. By January 6 all three ships of the convoy had arrived in Amsterdam and loading had begun. As the various powder factories in the city were not centralized, the ships were loaded individually. The Delfs Welvaaren was the first to be loaded, taking on 369 hundred-pound barrels of black powder. The barrels were covered with horsehair sheets to ward off an accidental ignition, and the ship's hold was sealed to prevent theft. The two other ships in the convoy were not filled as quickly, and so the government official managing the convoy ordered that the Delfs Welvaaren begin sailing ahead of schedule; the revised plan was for the ship to sail to Leiden, where it would idle for a few days while the rest of the convoy caught up. However, by the time the rest of the convoy was fully loaded, the cold January weather had frozen parts of the Amsterdam canal system, preventing the two remaining ships from rendezvousing with the Delfs Welvaaren.

The Delfs Welvaaren arrived in Leiden on 10 January. The two van Schies, who had a sister living in Leiden, planned to spend the weekend in the town center, but Saloman injured his leg or back and decided to stay with the ship. On the morning of 12 January the crew of the Delfs Welvaaren received word that the rest of the convoy was icebound and as such would not be arriving, and so the crew moved the Delfs Welvaaren from her moorings and into the Steenschuur, a canal which ran through some of the city's wealthier neighborhoods. Once the vessel was moored, Adam visited their sister again before returning to the ship in the afternoon. At around 4 pm Saloman was seen on deck talking to the two others, who were below decks in the hold, and immediately afterwards one of the crew was seen dumping potato peelings over the side of the ship. Other eyewitnesses reported seeing the crew preparing a meal of potatoes and fried fish.

=== Explosion ===
At around 4:15 pm, the Delfs Welvaaren exploded. One eyewitness, a canal dredger who was located 100m away from the ship when it detonated, noted that he had seen a single, small explosion lift up the ship's mast and send hatches flying, followed a second later by a massive explosion that disintegrated the vessel. The force of the explosion destroyed many structures; over 200 were destroyed, and 151 people were killed. All of the tall structures in the town were damaged, and thousands of windows were shattered. In the days after the disaster, eyewitnesses reported streets filled with broken glass and shingles.

The Delfs Welvaaren was completely destroyed by the explosion. Parts of the ship were recovered; the ship's anchor was found 900 meters from the detonation point, while its large lead counterbalance was found 300 meters away.

==== Cause ====
Following the explosion, rumors spread as to what had caused the gunpowder to explode. As the Delfs Welvaaren was known to be captained by Adam van Schie, the elderly sailor was assumed to be dead and thus singled out for blame. Several Dutch newspapers (including one in Delft, van Schie's hometown) reported falsely that the captain had ignited the gunpowder by walking below decks with a lit pipe. When van Schie was found to be very much alive (he was seen eating in a tavern he owned behind Delft's town hall), these stories were retracted.

An investigation into the disaster focused on gathering information from witnesses and debris from the ship. Eventually it was concluded, on the basis of multiple reports of the crew of the Delfs Welvaaren preparing a meal of potatoes and fish prior to the blast, that a spark from a cooking fire or from metal utensils had ignited the gunpowder. However, in the early 2000s an in-depth report by Dutch historians concluded that the blast could have also been caused by the crew trying to steal gunpowder. The report noted that multiple eyewitnesses had seen one crewman on deck talking with the other two in the hold of the ship—a hold which had been sealed by Dutch authorities in Amsterdam to prevent the theft of gunpowder. It was also noted that the ship's hold had been somewhat fireproofed to ensure that stray sparks did not set off the gunpowder. The report also noted that eyewitnesses reported two separate explosions, implying a single barrel of gunpowder had detonated first before igniting the rest of the ship's cargo. The report concluded that the crew of the Delfs Welvaaren had intentionally attempted to open one barrel in order to steal some powder, but had inadvertently caused the barrel to ignite and explode. This initial explosion blew out the ship's hatches (as was seen by one eyewitness) before igniting the rest of the cargo.

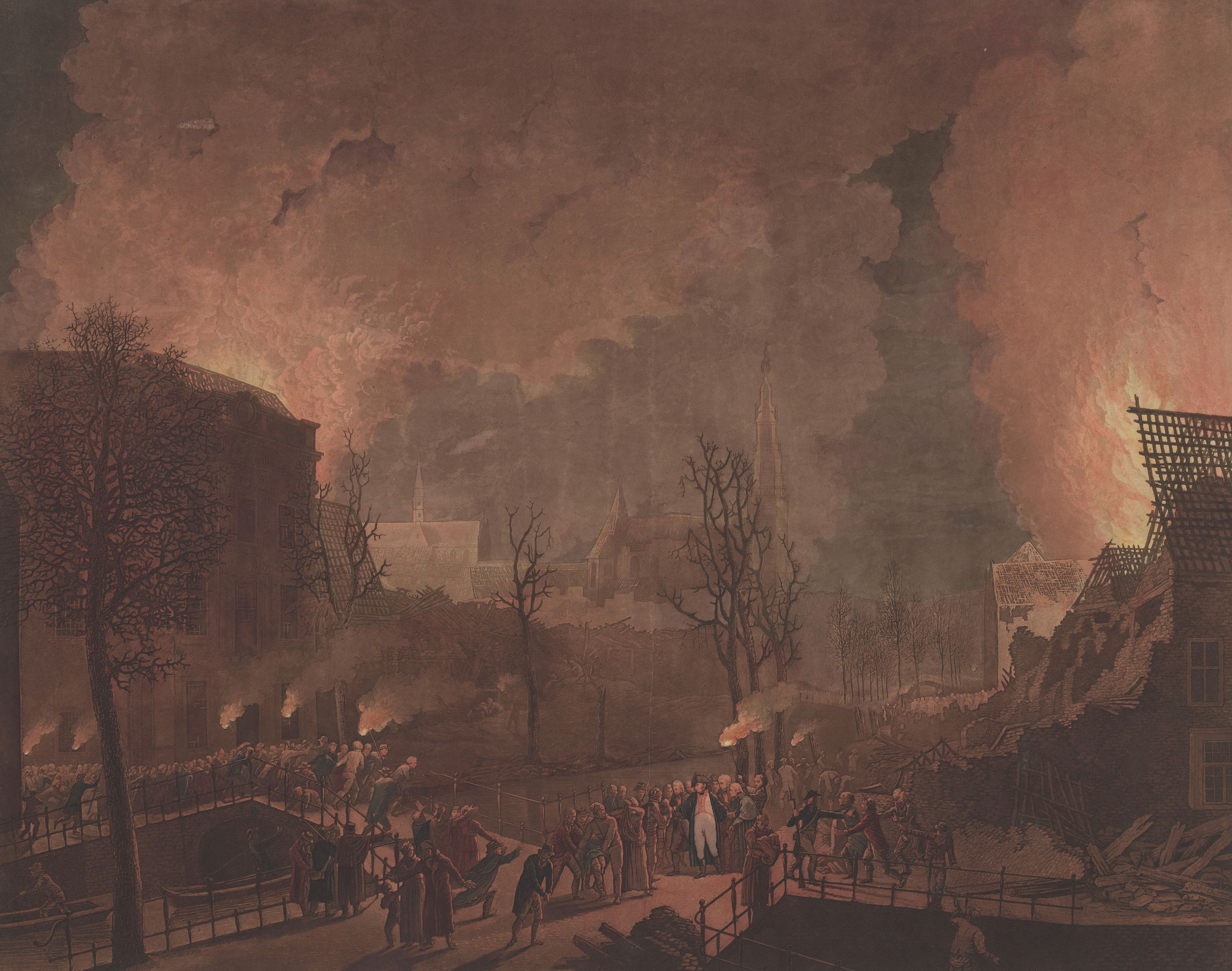
Louis Bonaparte visiting Leiden after the explosion

=== Aftermath ===
In the immediate aftermath of the explosion, King Louis traveled to Leiden to aid in the recovery effort. An effort was launched to rebuild the ruined part of the city, but it was discovered that Leiden's records had not been kept up to date; the latest records preserved were dated to the 1670s, and as such many buildings could only be rebuilt by memory. The destroyed area of the city was left abandoned until the 1820s, when a part of the affected area was transformed into a park.
