= Kirtie Ramdas =

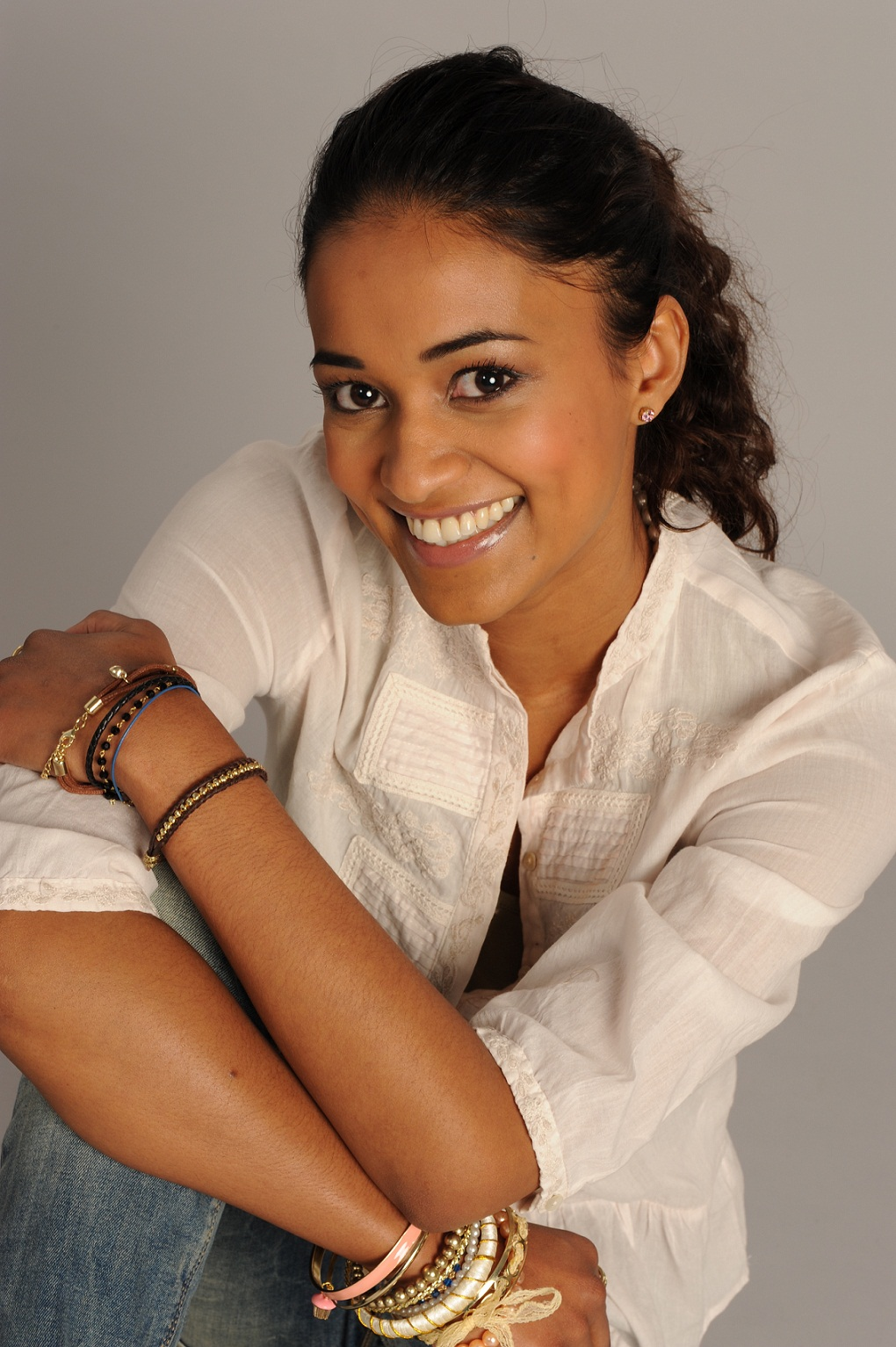
Kirtie Ramdas

Kirtie Ramdas (born 1980 in Leiden) is a Dutch television presenter and actress of Indo-Surinamese descent and mostly known for her work for the Dutch TV show Ch@tney.nl for the OHM and television presenter for Schooltv for the NTR. Currently she is in a TV commercial for Bonduelle and presents OHM Magazine for the OHM.

== Biography ==
Ramdas is a daughter of two teachers. Her parents emigrated from Suriname to the Netherlands in the late 1960s for educational purposes. She was educated at the Grammar School Stedelijk Gymnasium in Leiden and then studied medicine at the Leiden University. She obtained her master's degree in 2002 and graduated as a medical doctor in 2004.

She worked as a medical doctor in the field of surgery and plastic surgery, whilst working in the media as well, as a radio host for the urban radio station FunX and presenting various TV-programmes, acting in short movies and as a highlight presenting the Welcoming Event of International Indian Film Academy Awards in Amsterdam in 2005.
