= Aemilianus van Heel =

Dutch Franciscan friar

Johannes Wilhelm van Heel (8 June 1907 – 8 October 1938), later known as Father Aemilianus van Heel, was a Franciscan friar from the Netherlands, who served as a missionary in China and died in the second Sino-Japanese War.

== Biography ==
Van Heel was born in Leiden, the Netherlands, on 8 June 1907. His parents were Johannes Cornelis van Heel (a cobbler) and Maria Clasina Blesting. He entered the Franciscan order and was ordained a priest on 26 March 1933. Later that year he left for China as a missionary, where he took the name Hu Yong-Sheng. The young friar joined a group of about 20 Franciscan friar from the Netherlands in the south of Shanxi province, where they had been serving as missionaries for the Roman Catholic church since the 1890s.

On 13 September 1938, during the Second Sino-Japanese War, Japanese troops invaded Shanxi province. Some 2000 people sought refuge with the church of Shitougeta (currently Changzhi) in Yuanqu County, where van Heel was the parish priest. On 8 October 1938, when Japanese soldiers demanded that the women in the church be handed over to them, he refused to comply. He was found dead the next morning.

On 17 June 2017, a monument for van Heel was erected at his grave. It has an inscription in Chinese which, in English translation, reads: AEMILIANUS VAN HEEL, Franciscan missionary, born 1907.06.08 in Leiden, Holland. Came to China in 1933. From 1937 worked as a priest in Shitou (Chang Zhi) Church in Yuanqu. He protected thousands of refugees, especially women, from Japanese troops and was murdered 1938.10.08 in retaliation. Be remembered forever for virtue and courage.
