= Turin Cathedral =

Roman Catholic cathedral in Turin, Italy

- Cathedral of Saint John the Baptist; Italian: Cattedrale di San Giovanni Battista; Latin: Ecclesia Sancti Johannis Baptista
- Duomo di Torino
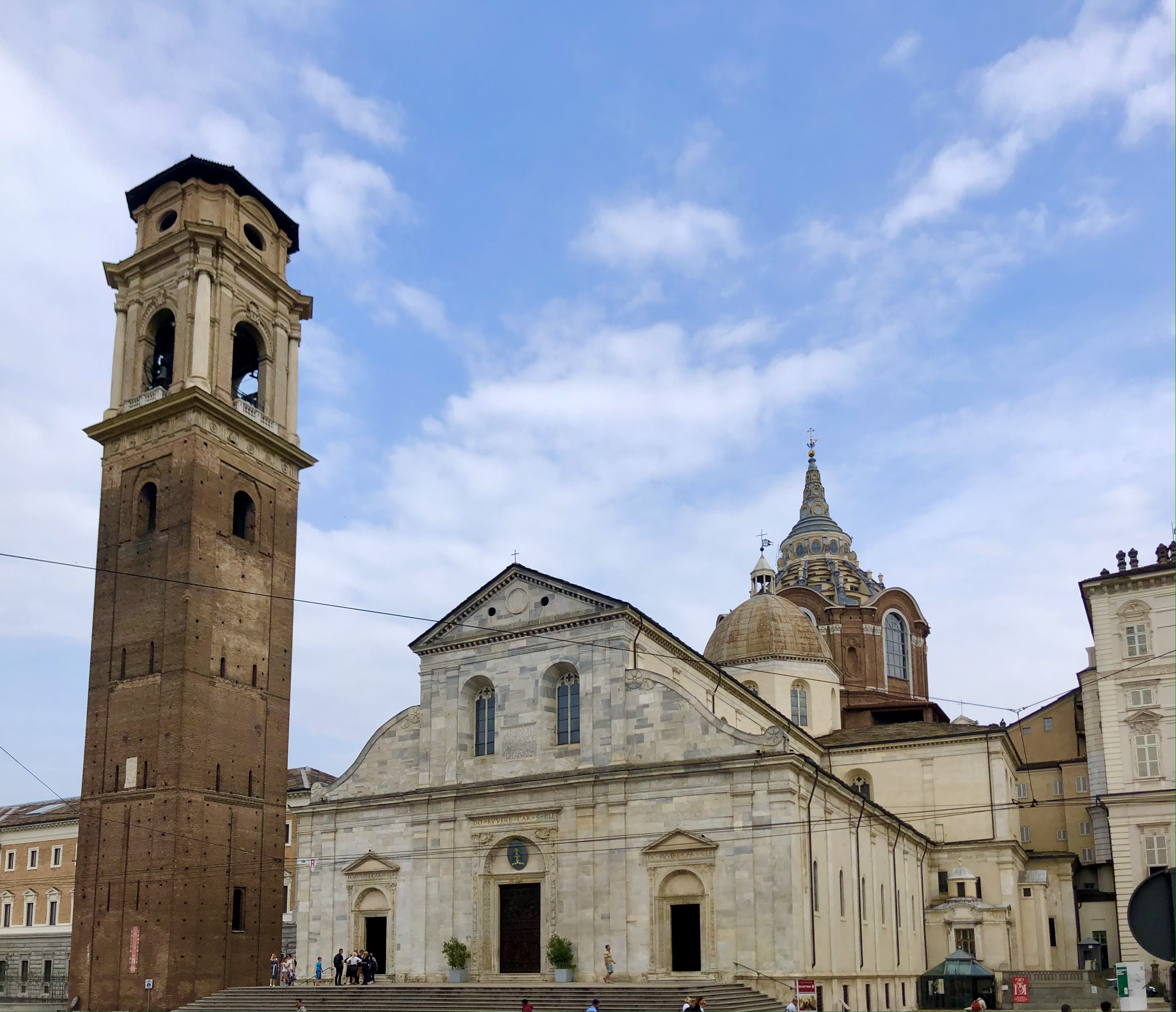
- The cathedral in 2019

- Map of Turin
- 45°04′24″N 7°41′08″E
- Location: Turin
- Country: Italy
- Denomination: Roman Catholic Church
- Website: www.duomoditorino.it

History
- Status: Cathedral
- Consecrated: 1505

Architecture
- Functional status: Active
- Architect: Amedeo di Francesco da Settignano (it)
- Style: Renaissance and Baroque
- Years built: 1468–1470 (bell tower); 1491–1498

Administration
- Province: Turin
- Archdiocese: Turin

Clergy
- Archbishop: Roberto Repole

Turin Cathedral or Cathedral of Saint John the Baptist (Italian: Duomo di Torino; Cattedrale di San Giovanni Battista, Latin: Ecclesia Sancti Johannis Baptista) is a Roman Catholic cathedral in Turin, northern Italy. Dedicated to Saint John the Baptist (Italian: San Giovanni Battista). It is the seat of the Archbishops of Turin.

It was built between 1491 and 1498, adjacent to a bell tower which had been built in 1470. The Chapel of the Holy Shroud, the former location of the Shroud of Turin, was designed by Guarino Guarini and added to the structure in 1668–1694.

== History ==
=== Lombard church ===
The church lies where the theatre of the ancient Roman city was located. Later, the site was developed with the construction of a complex of original three Christian churches, dedicated to the Holy Saviour, Saint Mary of Dompno (Santa Maria de Dompno) and (the largest one) to St. John the Baptist. According to some sources, the consecration of the main church was carried on by Agilulf, the Lombard King of northern Italy from 591 to 613. In 662, Garibald, Duke of Turin (it) was assassinated in the church by a follower of Godepert, whose murder Garibald is believed to have had a part in.

The first three churches were demolished between 1490 and 1492. The construction of the new cathedral, still dedicated to St. John the Baptist, began in 1491. Amedeo de Francisco di Settignano, also known as Meo del Caprino, designed it and completed the construction in seven years. The pre-existing bell tower, was preserved. Filippo Juvarra modified the tower in the 17th century. Pope Leo X officially confirmed the church as metropolitan see in 1515.

In 1649 Bernardino Quadri prepared a project to enlarge the cathedral, to create a more impressive seat for the Holy Shroud. Quadri had moved from Rome to join the court of Duke Charles Emmanuel II of Savoy in Turin. His design was based on an earlier project by Carlo di Castellamonte: it included building an oval chapel behind the choir. In 1667 Guarino Guarini was invited to complete the project. The construction of the dome took 28 years: it was completed in 1694 under the direction of Marie Jeanne of Savoy, Charles Emmanuel II's widow.

The cathedral is the burial place and major shrine of St. Pier Giorgio Frassati (1901–1925), Turin native, avid athlete, and benefactor of the poor, called the "saint for youth of the Third Millennium." He was beatified by John Paul II in 1990, and canonized by Pope Leo XIV on September 7, 2025.

The Shroud of Turin has been kept in shrine within the cathedral since 1993, after it was moved from the Chapel of the Holy Shroud.

== Notable people ==
Maestro di cappelli

- Simon Boyleau
- Alessandro Besozzi
- Quirino Gasparini
- Felice Alessandri
- Feliciano Strepponi

=== Organists ===
Ruggier Trofeo

Funerals and burials

- Giovanni "Gianni" Agnelli, member of the Agnelli family that owns Fiat
- Andrea Pininfarina
- Luciana Frassati Gawronska
- Blessed Pier Giorgio Frassati

As Turin was the capital city of the Kingdom of Piedmon-Sardinia, the cathedral is one of two in which members of the royal family (including the cadet branches) are buried in, the other being the Basilica of Superga in the outskirts of the city. Several royal consorts and princesses are buried here.

== Gallery ==
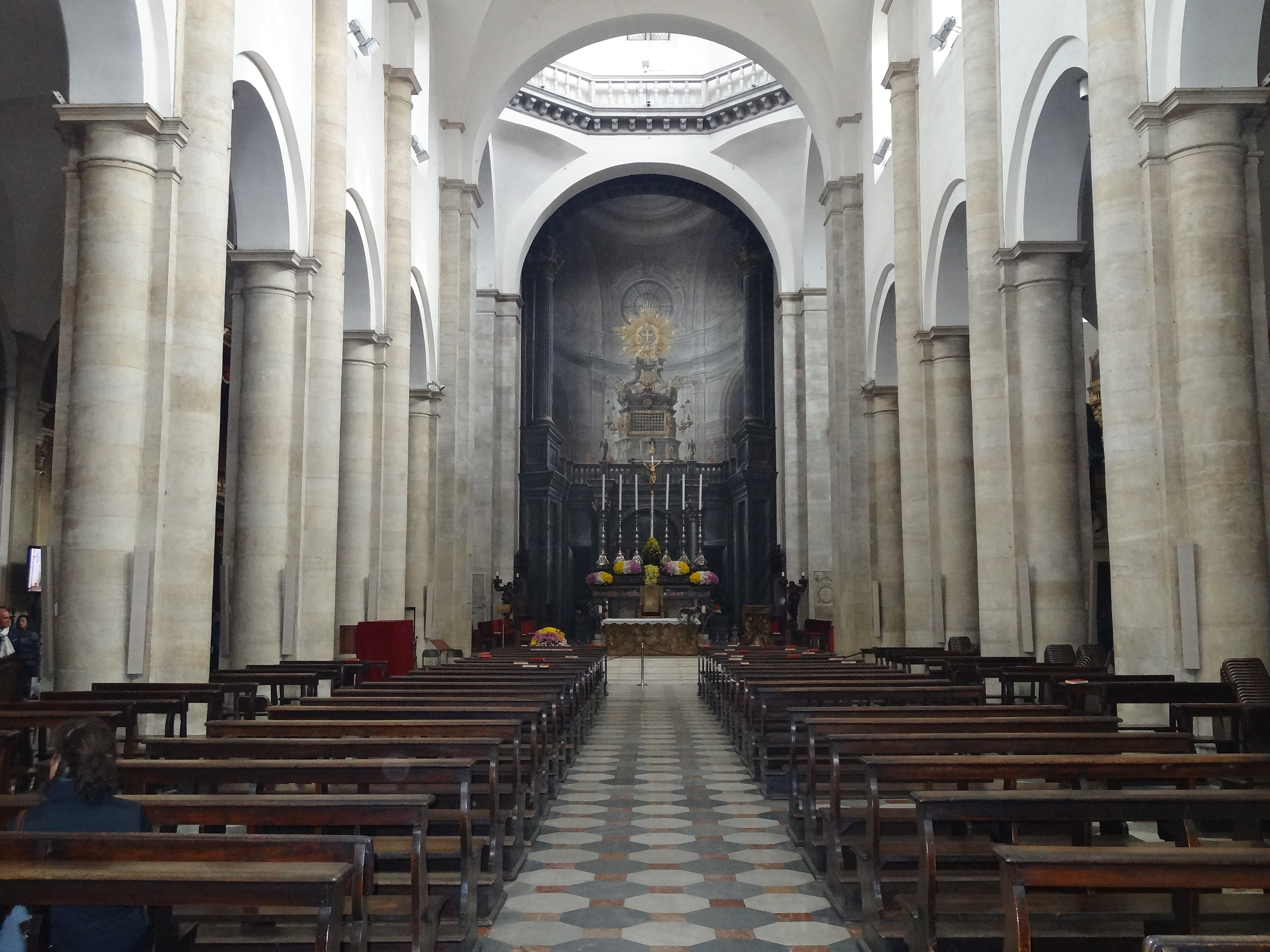
The central nave. Behind the altar, the panel painting that replicates the original viewing on the Chapel of the Holy Shroud with the Altar of Bertola. Both works have been seriously damaged during the fire of 1997 and are still under restoration

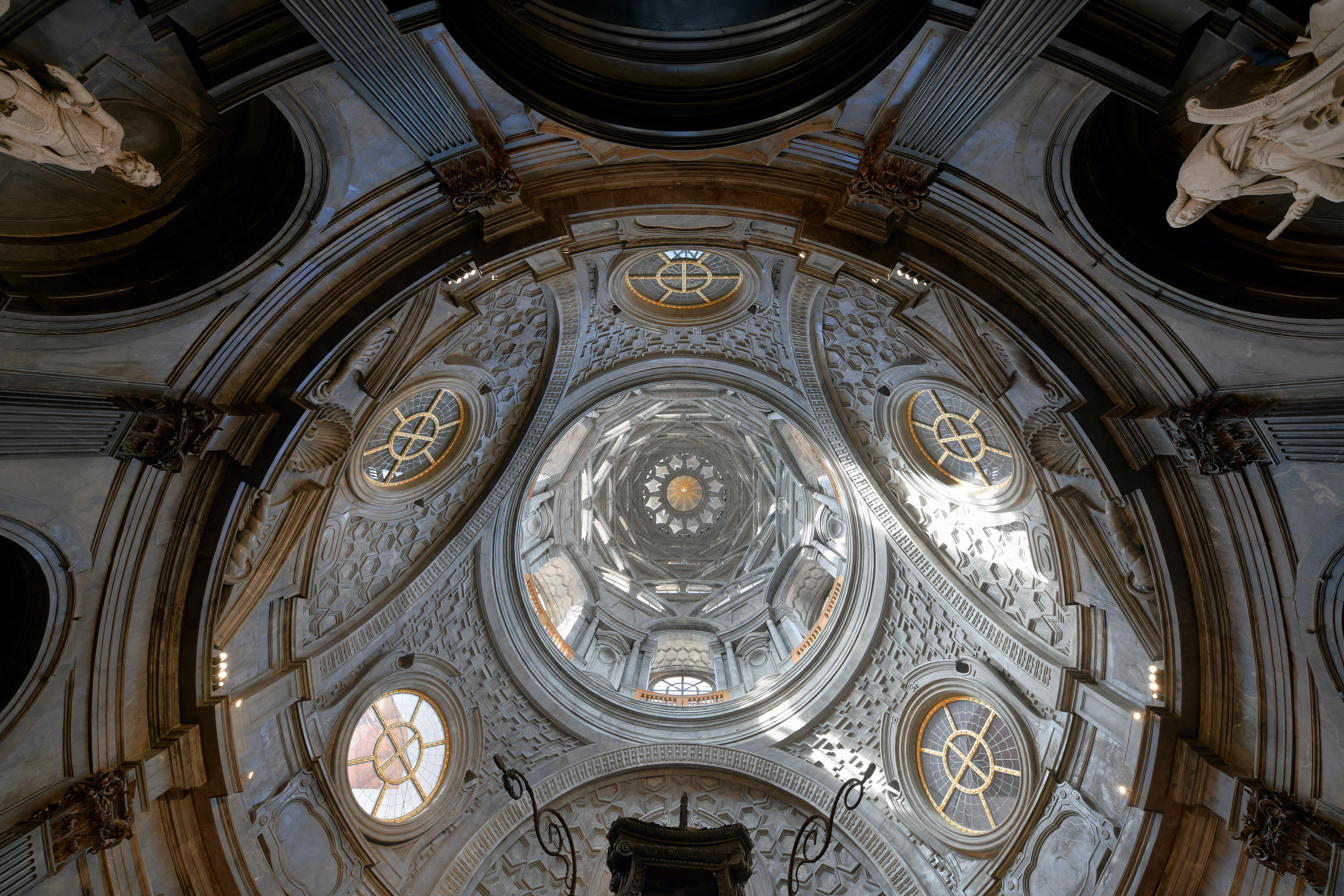
Inside of the Guarini Chapel

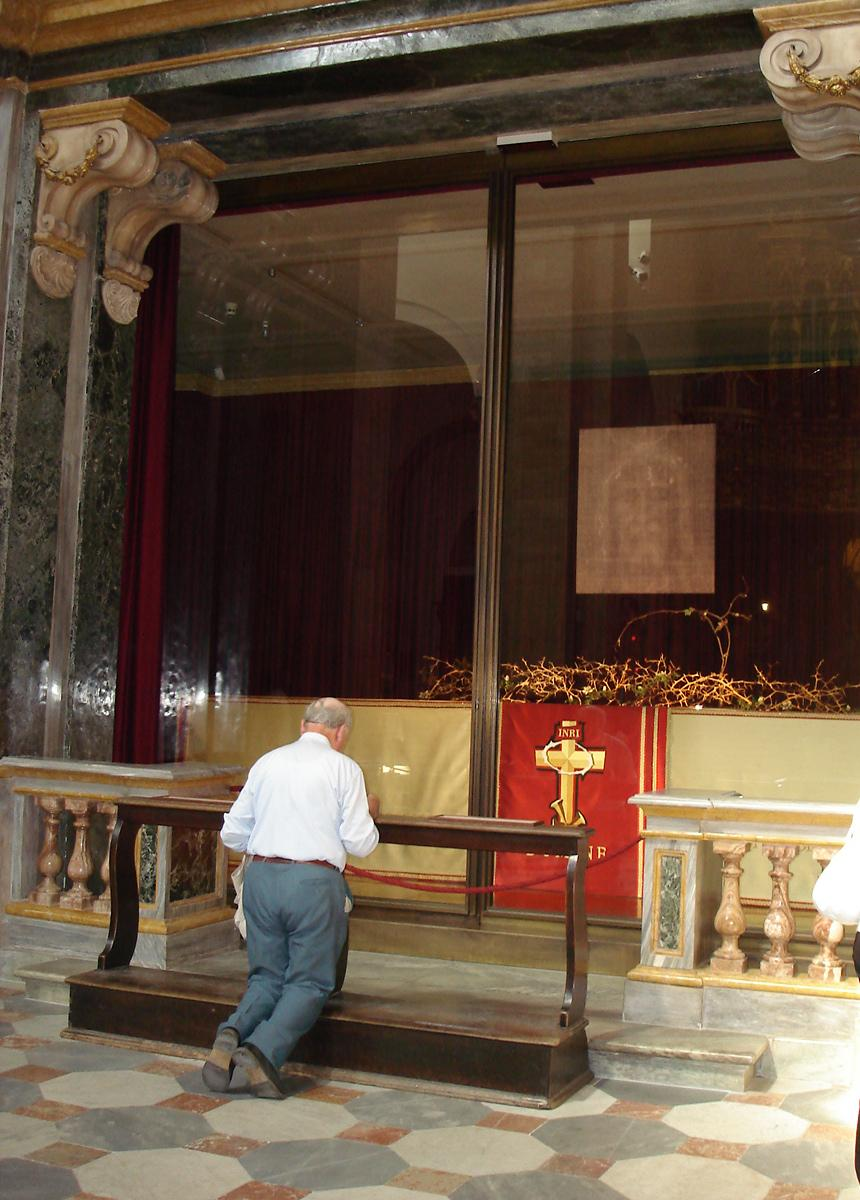
A churchgoer prays in front of the Holy Shroud

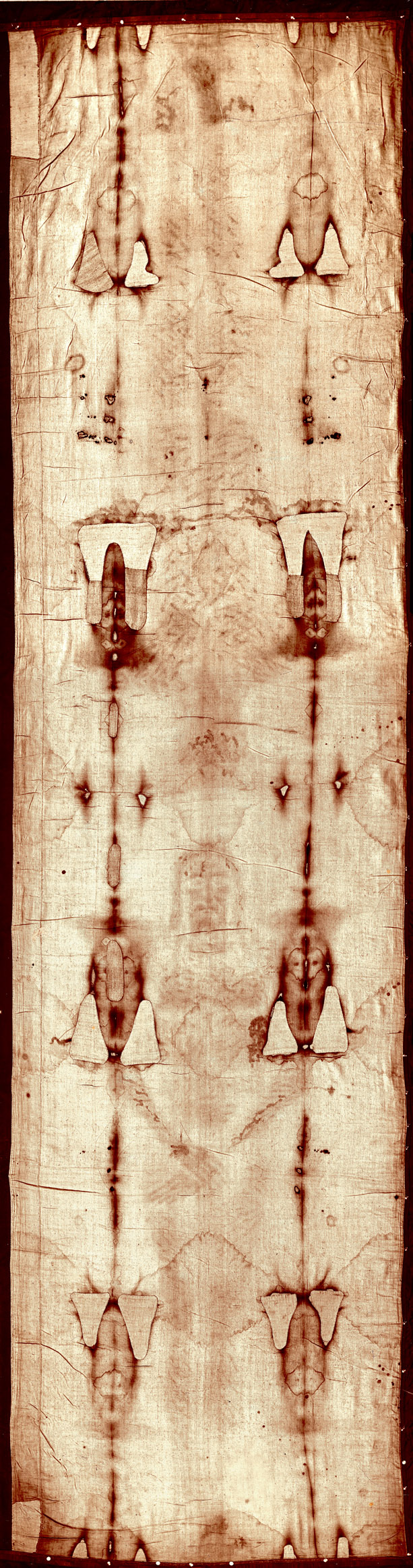
The Holy Shroud is visible only during the Ostensioni

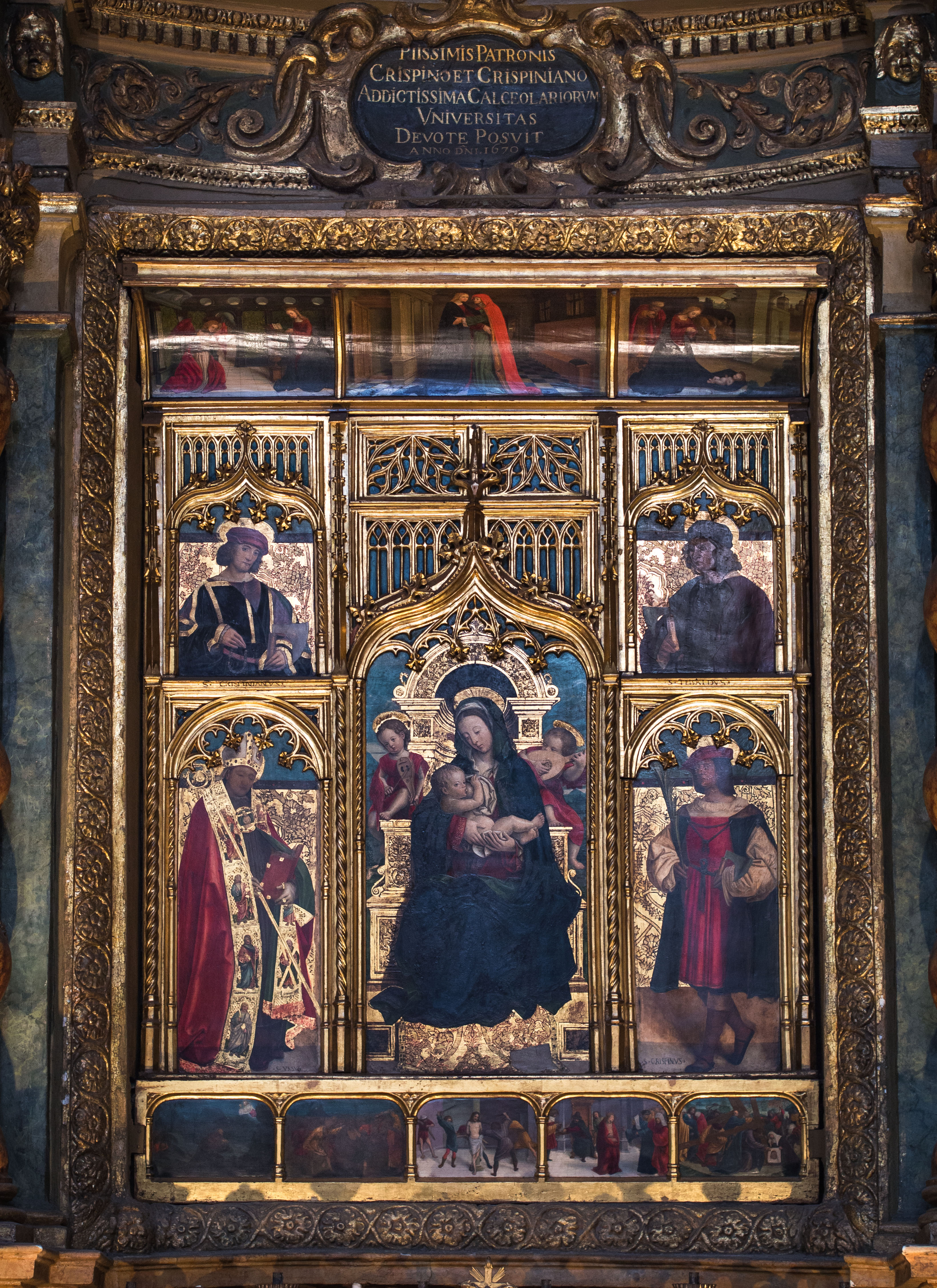
Cappella dei Santi Crispino e Crispiniano. Polyptych of the Shoemakers Company (1498–1504), Giovanni Martino Spanzotti and Defendente Ferrari

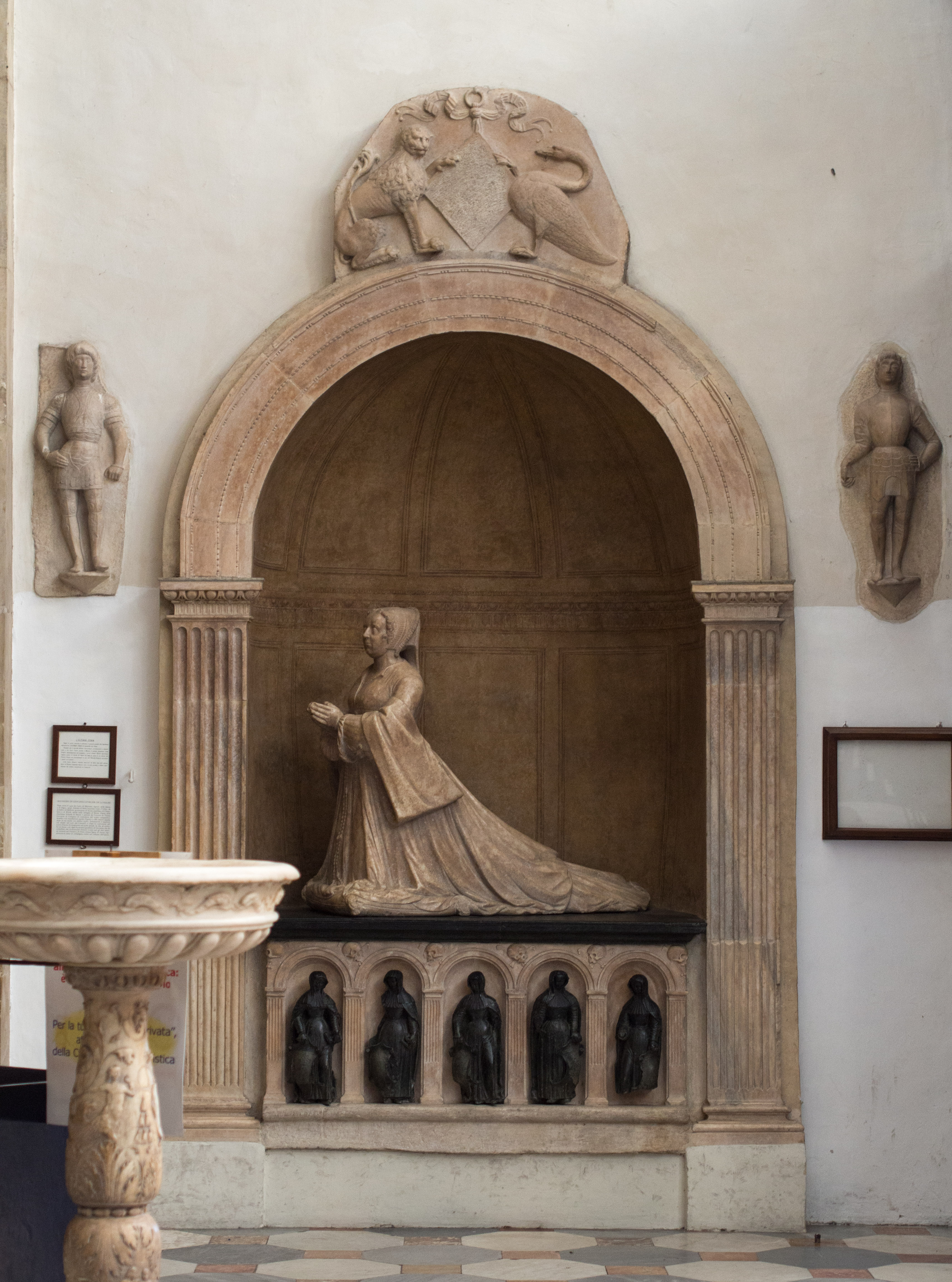
Giovanna d'Orlier de la Balme tomb monument. At the top is missing the emblem of the family that was destroyed by French troops during the Napoleonic occupation

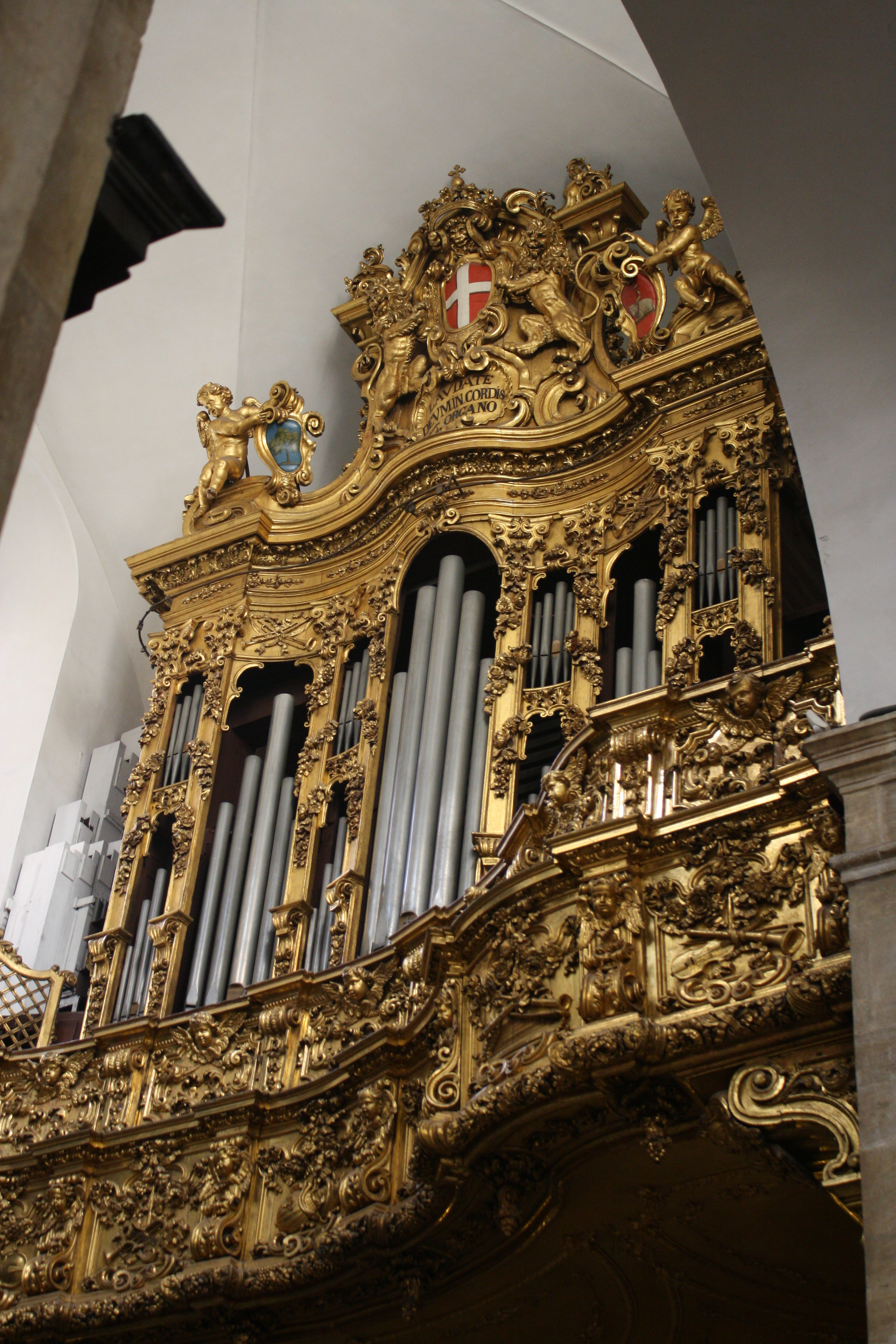
Vegezzi-Bossi organ

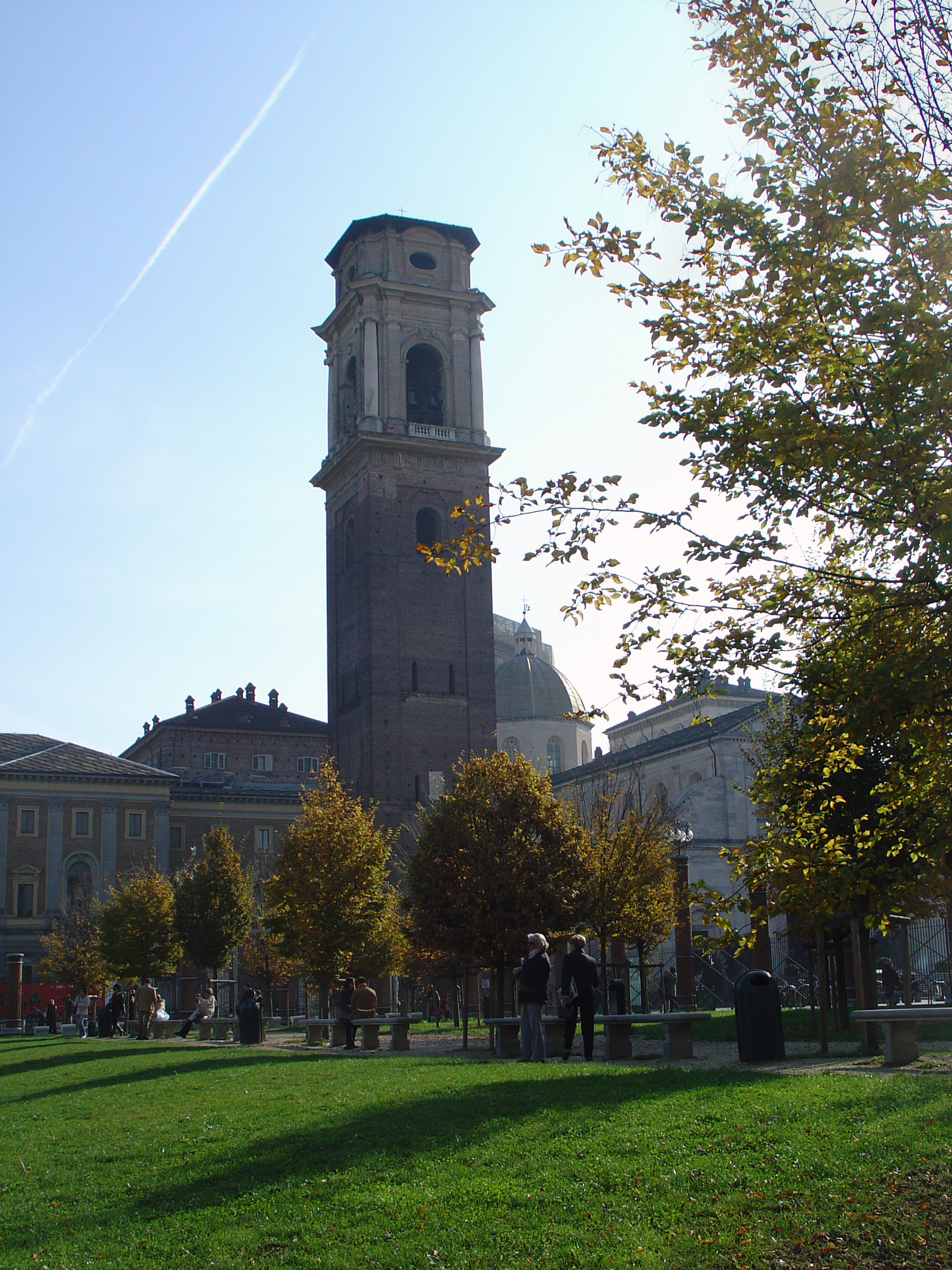
Bell tower
