= Chapel of the Holy Shroud =

Chapel originally housing the Shroud of Turin

- Cappella della Sacra Sindone
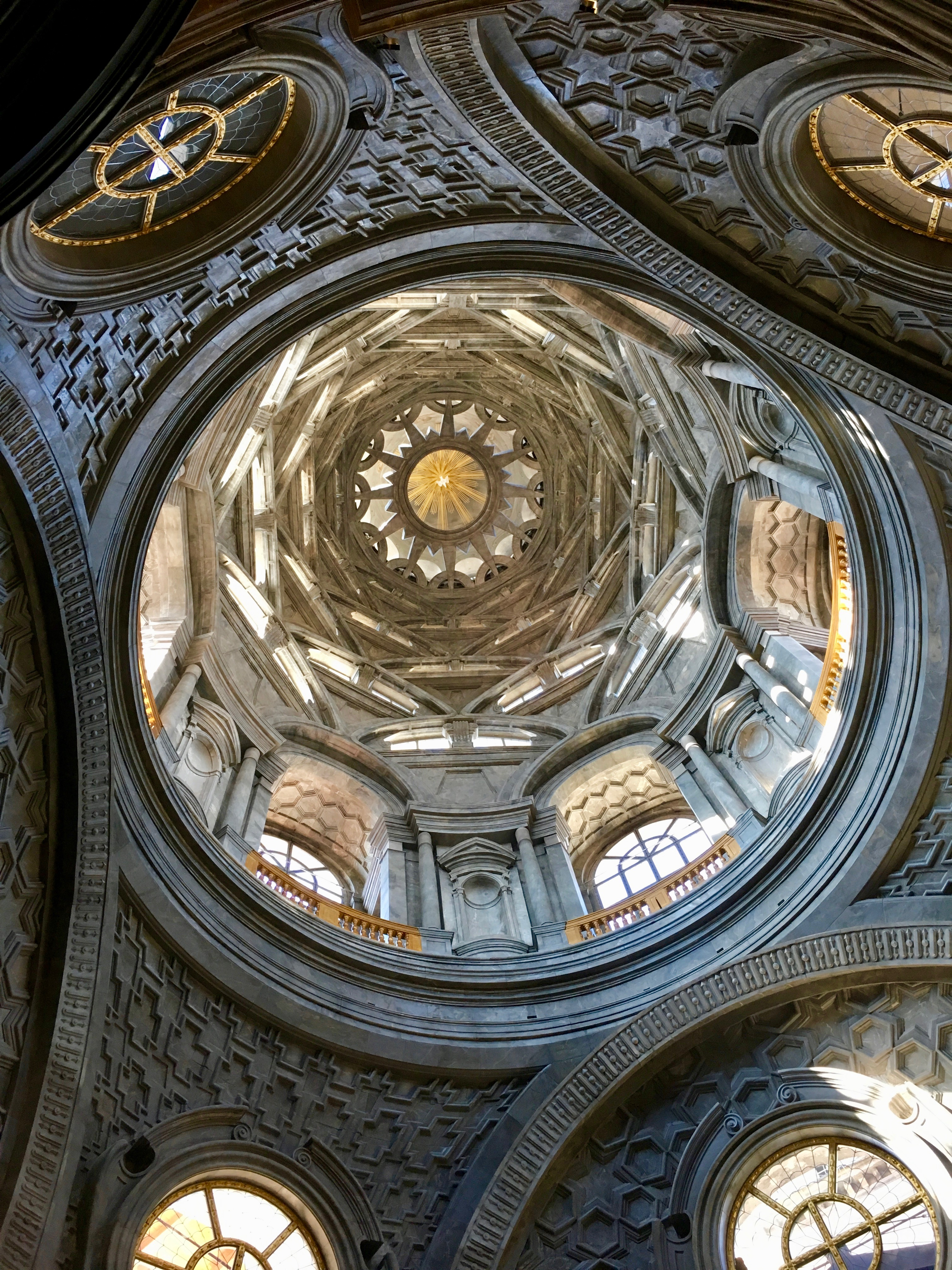
- Interior of the chapel

- Location within Turin

Religion
- Affiliation: Catholic
- Diocese: Archdiocese of Turin

Location
- Location: Turin, Italy
- Coordinates: 45°04′24″N 7°41′08″E

Architecture
- Architect: Guarino Guarini
- Type: Chapel
- Style: Baroque
- Funded by: House of Savoy
- Groundbreaking: 1668
- Completed: 1694

The Chapel of the Holy Shroud (Italian: Cappella della Sacra Sindone) is a Baroque style Roman Catholic chapel in Turin in northern Italy, constructed to house the Shroud of Turin (Sindone di Torino), a religious relic alleged to be the burial shroud of Jesus of Nazareth. It is located adjacent to the Turin Cathedral and connected to the Royal Palace of Turin. The chapel was designed by architect-priest and mathematician Guarino Guarini and built at the end of the 17th century (1668–1694), during the reign of Charles Emmanuel II, Duke of Savoy, and is considered one of the masterpieces of Baroque architecture. Some of the chapel's architectural features, such as the ribbed dome, originated in Islamic architecture. Heavily damaged in a fire in 1997, it underwent a complex 21 year restoration project, and reopened in 2018. The chapel has an intricate and self-supporting wooden and marble dome.

== History ==
Duke Carlo Emanuele I of Savoy commissioned the chapel between 1610 and 1611 to Ascanio Vitozzi and Carlo di Castellamonte to preserve the Shroud that the house of Savoy had held for several centuries. The initial plan called for an ellipsoidal chapel set between the cathedral and the Palazzo Ducale (former bishop's palace and current Royal Palace). The work was interrupted in 1624 when only the foundations had been laid. The project did not progress during the reign of Vittorio Amedeo I or during the regency of Maria Cristina.

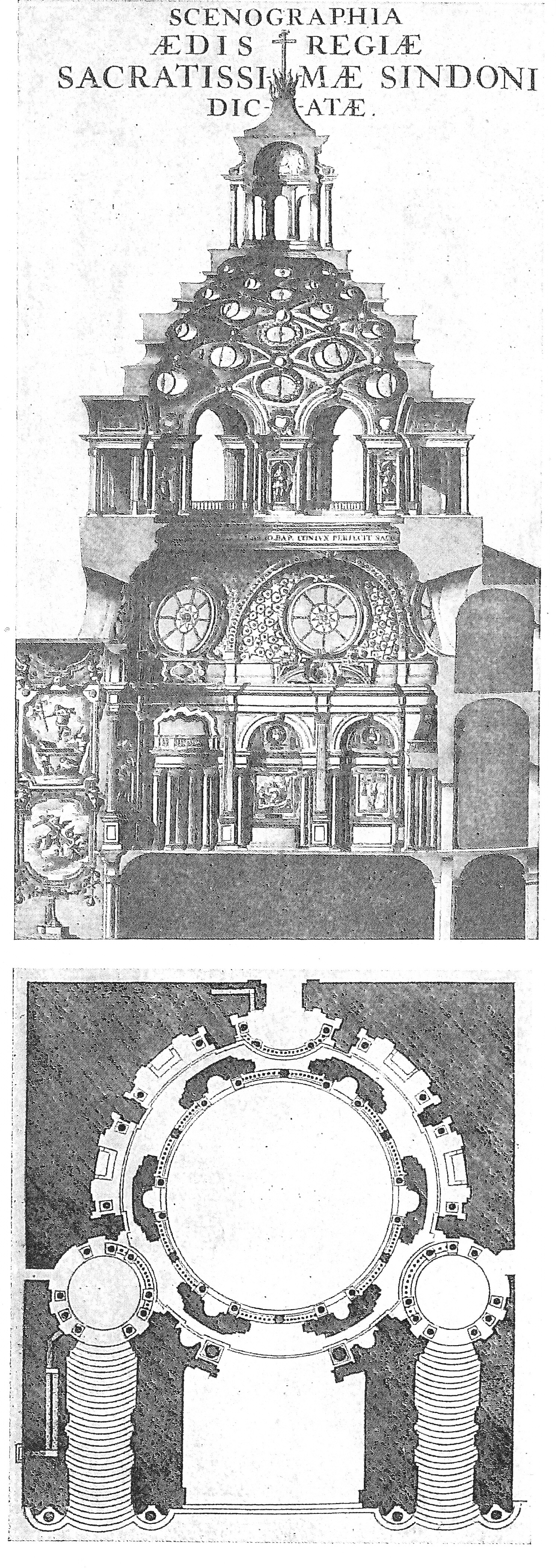
Project by Guarino Guarini

The project was revived by Charles Emmanuel II in 1657. It was Cardinal Maurizio di Savoia who pressed for its completion, uneasy with the Shroud being kept on a temporary wooden altar. He was in fact mindful of the great fire of 1532 in Chambery which had damaged the Shroud. The projects were entrusted to Carlo di Castellamonte's son, the architect Amedeo di Castellamonte, and to the Swiss sculptor Bernardino Quadri, who were responsible for the design of a building with a square base set between the ducal palace and the apse of the Cathedral. Furthermore, the two opted to elevate the chapel 6–7 meters with respect to the floor of the cathedral. This meant that the inside of the chapel was visible from inside the cathedral. The faithful could access the chapel through two large staircases placed at the end of each of the aisles, while the royals could access it through a portal on the first floor of the palace. The ellipsoidal foundations were therefore demolished and replaced, and for nine years the project proceeded apace. The construction was interrupted when the entablature of the first level was reached, when structural problems were noticed in the structure. Unable to solve the problem, Bernardino Quadri was removed from the project in 1666.

=== Guarini's project ===
The project was entrusted to the priest-architect Guarino Guarini who, after leaving Paris in 1666, stopped in Turin in 1667 and took over the work on the chapel in 1668. He adopted the round-shaped project previously developed by Bernardino Quadri, which had been completed up to the first level. Guarini modified the previously completed structure, reinforcing the walls which had caused problems for their thinness and structural capabilities. He decorated the Corinthian-inspired pilasters with images and symbols linked to the Passion of Jesus (including olive branches, crowns of thorns, passion flower and the Titulus crucis). Furthermore, he reshaped the right staircase. He reduced the spandrels from four to three, creating a triangle with three vestibules at the vertices (one at the entrance from the palace and the other two at the staircases towards the cathedral). As for the portion of the chapel not yet undertaken, Guarini completely revolutionized the project. In particular, Guarini redesigned the dome, in order to lighten it and give it an upward thrust. The original project included a hemispherical dome supported by piers. Guarini instead placed ornamental pediments and shell-shaped volutes. Above this, he placed large weight-bearing arches which redistribute the weight. Inside each of the three lunettes and three spandrels formed by the three arches he placed large circular windows. These arches, in addition to concealing the buttresses, also made it possible to tighten the dimensions of the drum and the base of the dome. Above the arches, on the next level, he placed a ring walkway surmounted by six large arched windows alternating with six tabernacle-like niches. To build the top of the dome, he created a series of six levels, each made up of six small arches arranged in a hexagonal plan. The size of each level shrinks with height and the hexagon plan of each floor is slanted in respect to the one below, so that the arches place their bases on the top of the arches below. The dome ends with a roof lantern formed by a twelve-pointed star surrounded by twelve ovoid windows. Inside the star, a small circular cap is decorated with the dove of the Holy Spirit from which luminous rays emerge. The dome ends with a pinnacle decorated with windows (real at the base and fake at the top) with a golden globe surmounted by a cross on top. In 1680, Giacomo Cortella frescoed the dome.

The dome was completed on 27 October 1679 and on 15 May 1680 Guarini himself celebrated the inaugural mass on a temporary wooden altar. The structure was usable, even if the interiors were not yet completed. Guarini died on March 6, 1683, leaving the floors, one of the stairways and the altar unfinished.

=== Completion ===
Donato Rossetti was appointed as Guarini's successor for the project in 1685, but died soon after in 1686. He was replaced by Antonio Bertola, who finished the project. At the center of the circular plan of the dome, Bertola placed a raised altar six steps from the floor. The floor was inlaid with concentric circles of stars within Greek crosses, arranged in a way to accentuate the centrality of the altar. The altar was of black marble and decorated with gilded wood or metal ornaments and sculptures. The shroud case was positioned in the central part, placed inside a glass case protected by a golden grate. Above the baluster of the altar were placed eight putti in prayer or bearing the nails of the passion, while four angels with the symbols of the passion were placed on the sides of the reliquary, all made by the sculptors Cesare Neurone and Francesco Borello between 1692 and 1694. In 1694 the Shroud was finally placed there. In 1825 King Carlo Felice commissioned the royal architect Carlo Randoni to build the Grande Chilassone, a huge stained glass window in walnut and iron to insulate the chapel from the cold and noise of the cathedral.

In the first half of the 19th century the chapel was decorated with groups of statues depicting famous members of the House of Savoy commissioned by King Charles Albert. The statue of Amadeus VIII (first duke of Savoy and antipope) was sculpted by Benedetto Cacciatori, that of duke Emmanuel Philibert (leader known as "Iron Head", who moved the capital from Chambery to Turin) by Pompeo Marchesi, that of Duke Charles Emmanuel II (who had begun the construction of the chapel) by Innocenzo Fraccaroli, and that of Prince Thomas Francis, Prince of Carignano (progenitor of the House of Savoy-Carignano line, to which Charles Albert belonged) by Giuseppe Gaggini. In the 19th century, two angels in white marble were also added to the ends of the baluster.

=== 1997 fire ===
The Chapel was closed to the public on May 4, 1990, when a fragment of marble from an internal cornice collapsed to the floor. The fall was caused by an infiltration of water. Three years later the restoration work began. With the conservative restoration site almost completed, a short circuit in the night between 11 and 12 April 1997 caused a fire that heavily damaged the building. The flames caused subsidence and collapse, and the marbles were also heavily damaged, also due to the thermal shock caused by the icy water from the extinguishing jets. The Shroud itself risked being destroyed but was saved from the flames by the firefighters, who broke through the glass case containing the wooden and silver box that kept the cloth. To avoid the collapse of the entire structure, hoops with metal chains were placed around it.

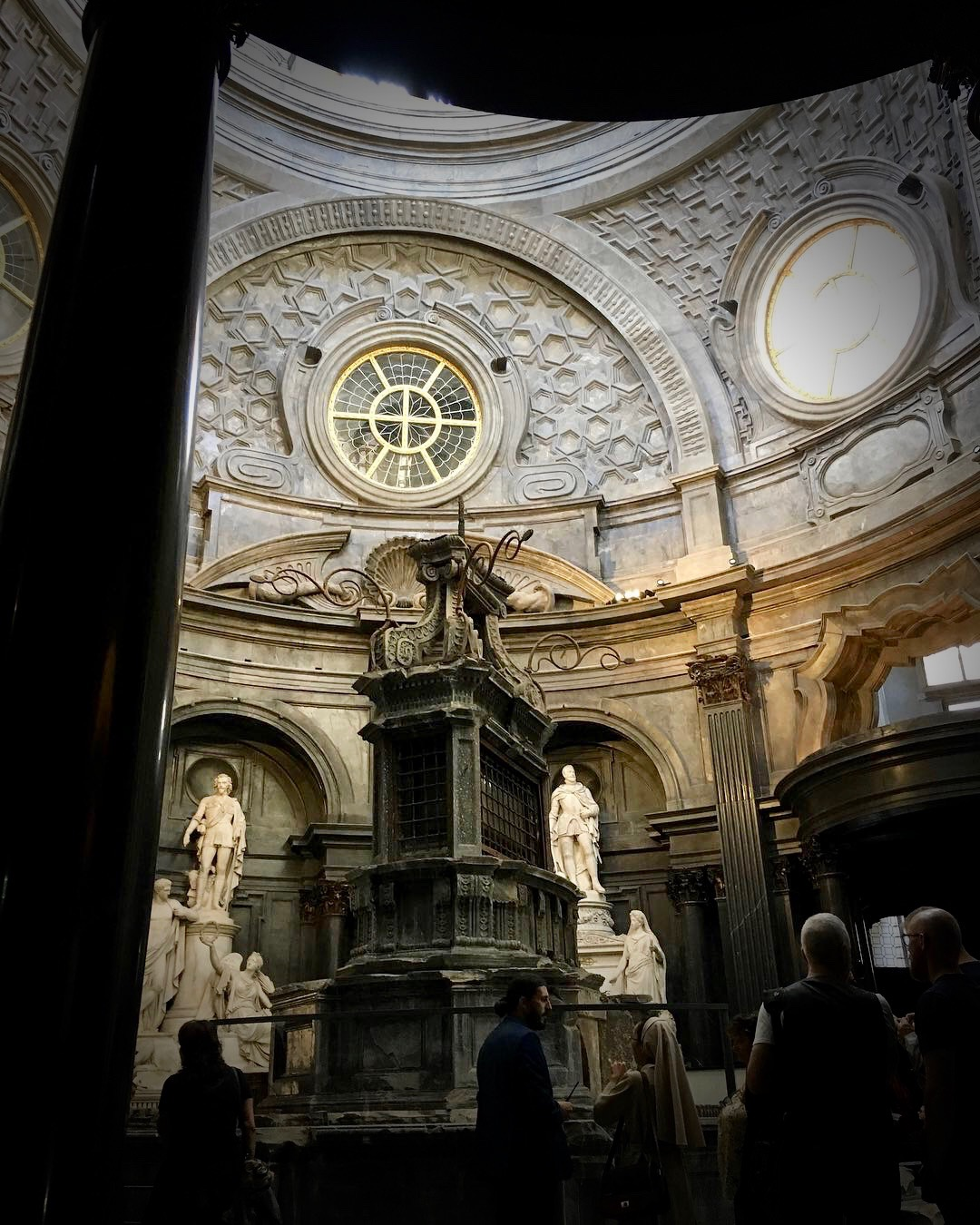
The restored chapel with the yet to be renovated altar

=== Restoration and recent history ===
The debris was immediately removed and the damage ascertained, from which it emerged that 80% of the stone surfaces needed to be restored. At the beginning of the 2000s the architectural restoration began, carried out in a conservative and most faithful way possible. The necessary marble was found in 2007 from the original quarries used in the 17th century in Frabosa Soprana, but once that source was exhausted it was also extracted from other locations in the Orobic and Apuan Alps. The elements that could not be recovered were made from scratch with the help of 3D modeling. The dome was disassembled and reassembled entirely and suspended on temporary scaffolding to remove damaged material. The roofs and lead coverings, the metal hoops, the windows, the Grande Chilassone, and the sunburst with the Holy Spirit in the dome were completely redone. Cortella's cupola paintings were renovated.

The restoration and reconstruction, resulting among the winners of the European Heritage Awards in 2019, were completed after 28 years and the chapel was reopened to the city and visitors on 27 September 2018, thus becoming part of the Royal Museums tour itinerary of Turin. The restoration was one of the most complicated ever carried out, and cost over 30 million Euros, of which 28 by the Ministry of Culture, 2.7 by the Compagnia di San Paolo and the remainder with other contributions from La Stampa, Iren and of others. In 2021 the partial restoration of the altar was also completed, thus completing the recovery of the monument. The restoration succeeded in recovering the surfaces and the marbles and structures of the altar, together with the cherubs and the statues of two angels (who survived the fire because they were temporarily in the sacristy at the time of the fire), the embossed silver tabernacle, the lamps and the pyramid candlesticks . The other statues, together with the large summit star in gilded wood, have not been recovered and are lost (an image of the altar before the fire with the lost parts can be found here).

== See also ==
- 17th-century Western domes

== Gallery ==
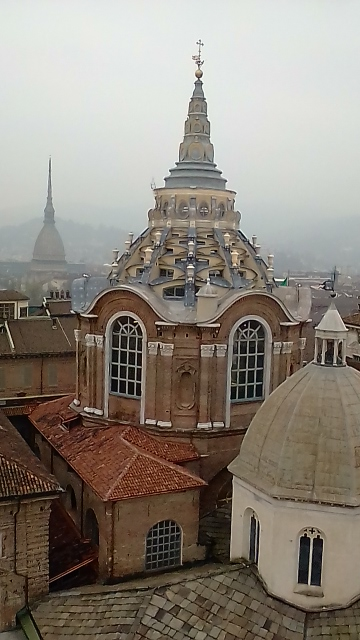
External view (with the Turin Cathedral dome in the forefront and the Mole Antonelliana in the background)

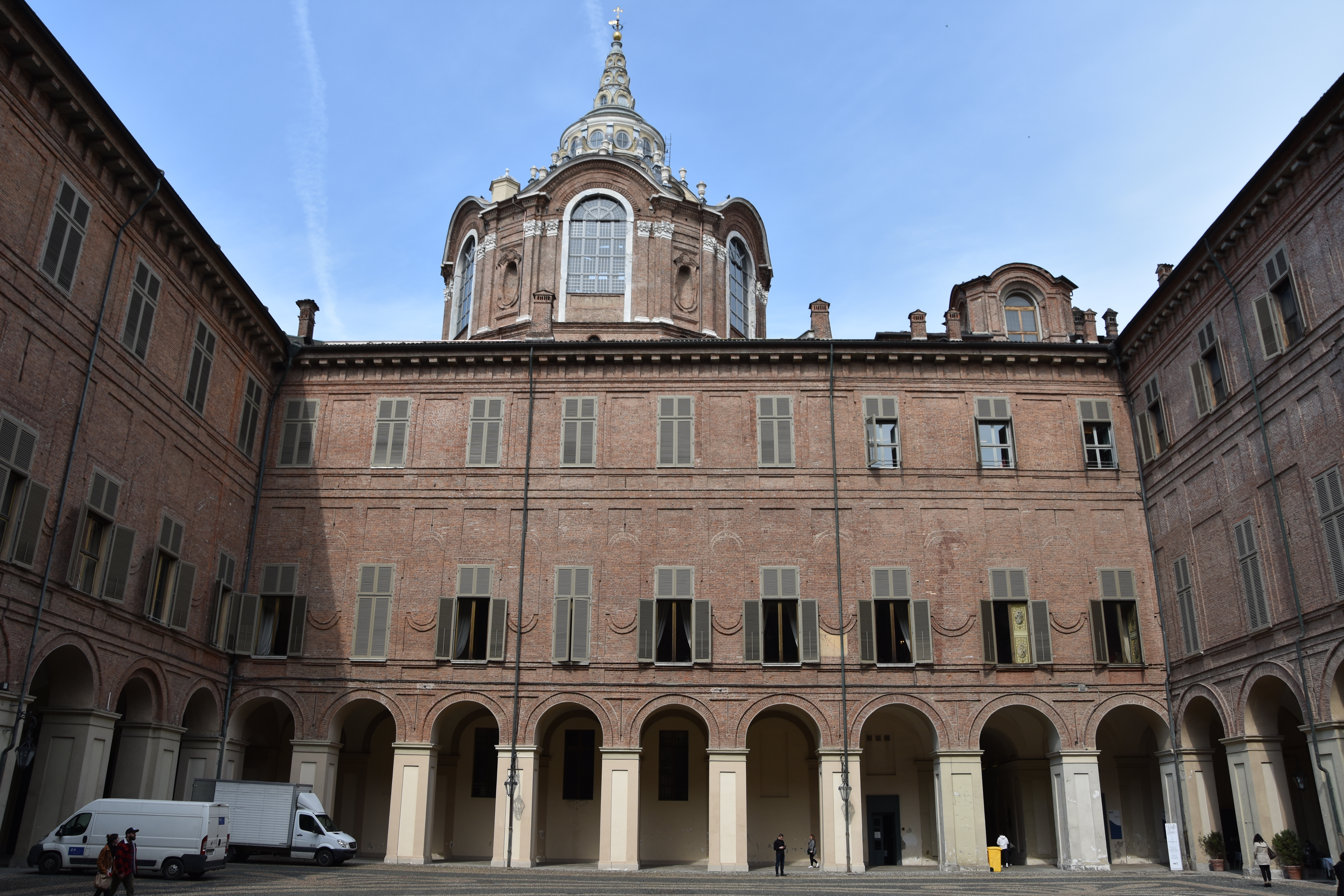
View from the Royal Palace courtyard

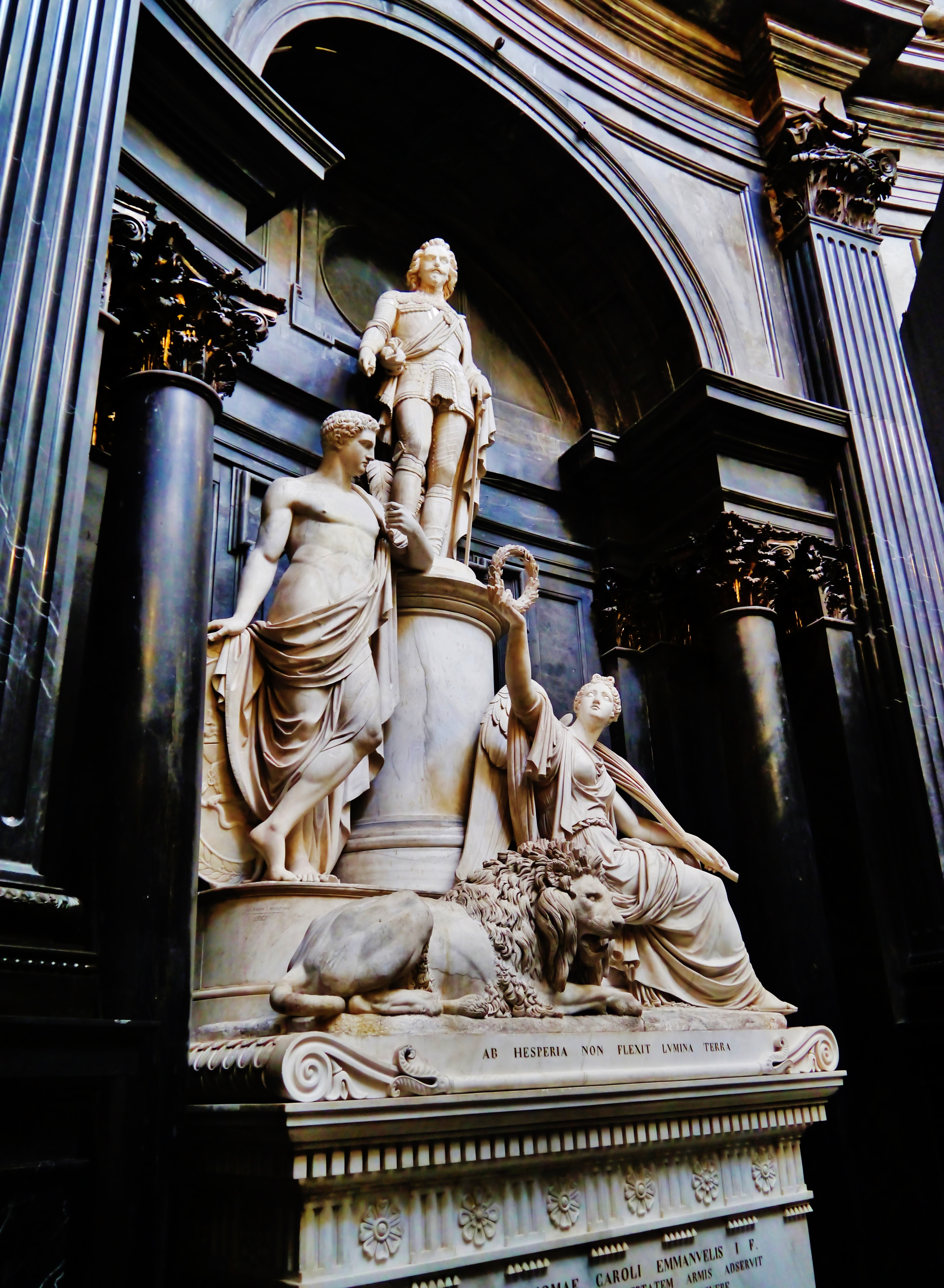
Statue of Thomas Francis, Prince of Carignano

== Bibliography ==
- Varriano, John L. (1986). Italian Baroque and Rococo architecture. New York, N. Y. u.a: Oxford Univ. Press. ISBN 978-0-19-503548-3.
- Meek, H.A., Guarino Guarini and his architecture, Yale University Press, New Haven and London, 1988
- Wittkower, R., Studies in the italian baroque, BAS Printers Limited, Great Britain, 1975.
