= San Lorenzo, Turin =

Church in Turin, Italy

Royal Church of Saint Lawrence
- Real Chiesa di San Lorenzo
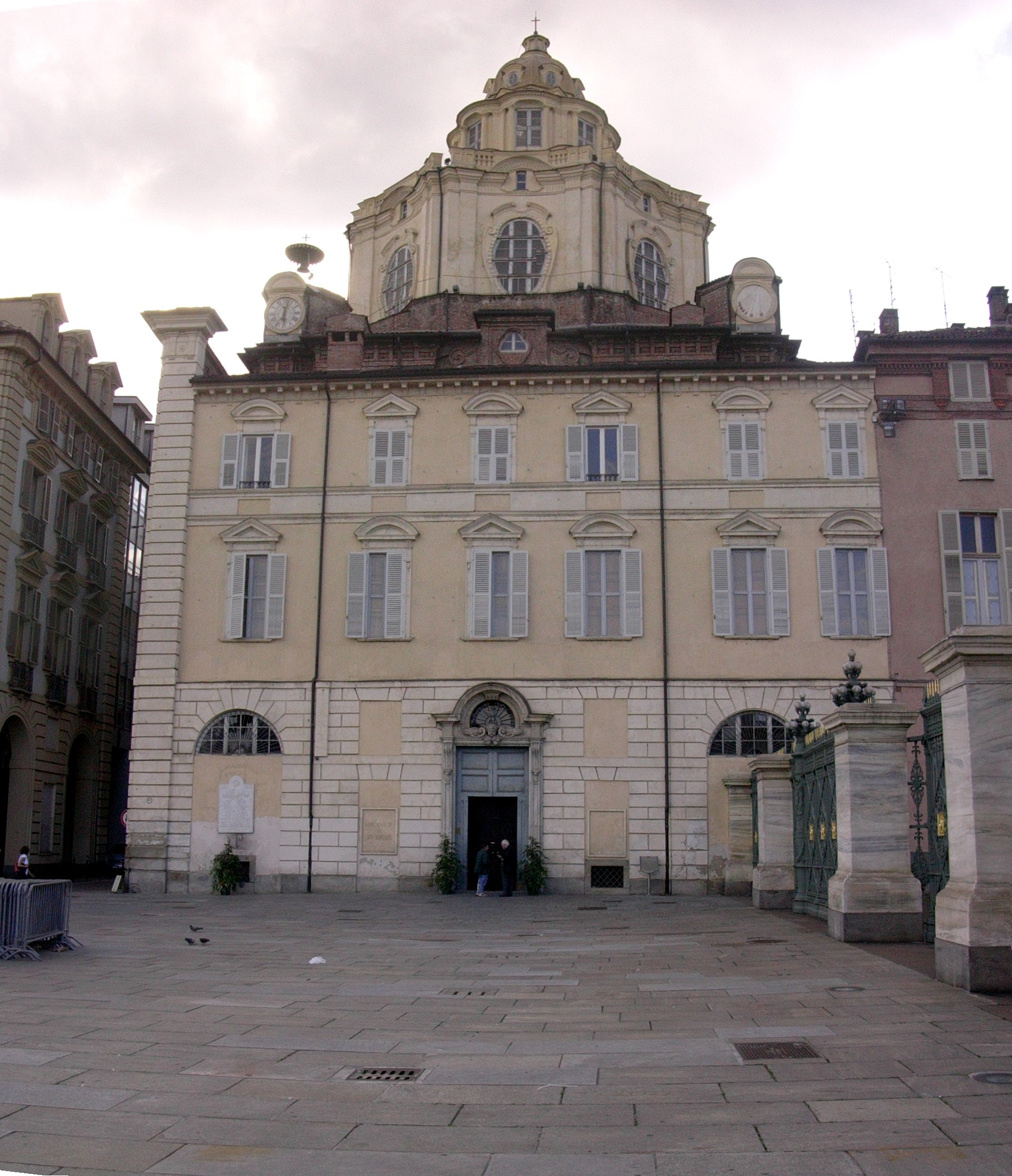
- Façade of the church

- Map of Turin
- 45.0721°N 7.6849°E
- Country: Italy
- Denomination: Roman Catholic Church
- Website: Official website

Architecture
- Architect: Guarino Guarini
- Style: Baroque
- Groundbreaking: 1634
- Completed: 1680

Administration
- Archdiocese: Turin

San Lorenzo, also known as the Royal Church of Saint Lawrence (Italian: Real Chiesa di San Lorenzo), is a Baroque-style church in Turin, adjacent to the Royal Palace of Turin. The present church was designed and built by Guarino Guarini during 1668–1687.

== History ==
Emmanuel Philibert, Duke of Savoy, was one of the leaders of the Habsburg armies of his cousin Philip II of Spain; they decisively defeated the French armies in the Battle of Saint-Quentin in Northern France on 10 August 1557, the Feast of St. Lawrence (San Lorenzo), which affected the outcome of the Treaty of Cateau-Cambrésis; in which, the Savoy, including Turin, was returned to the rule of the duke. That the Battle occurred on the Saint's feast instigated Phillip's denomination and design of the palace of El Escorial. Emmanuel Philibert, on his return to Turin in 1562, renovated the old ducal chapel of Santa Maria ad Presepae, which is still present near the entrance, and erected this church dedicated to St. Lawrence. Construction of the contemporary church began in 1634.

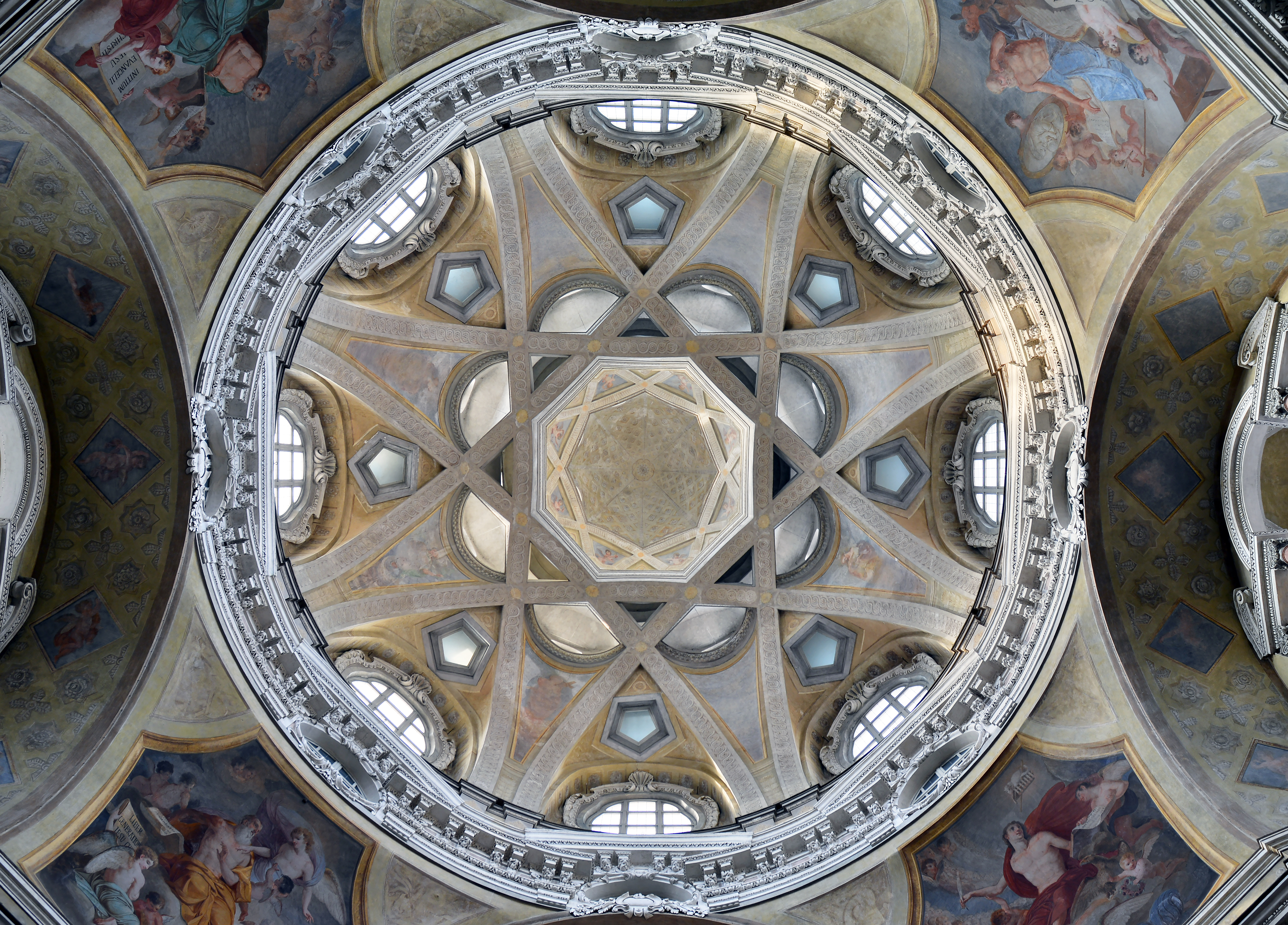
Interior view of cupola.

The architect Guarino Guarini was a great innovator in Baroque principles first developed by the great Roman Baroque architect Francesco Borromini, in particular the play with optical effects and organic "deconstruction" of the classical orders and principles of column and entablature. However, in San Lorenzo Guarini took these further. The ground plan is a kind of square which becomes an octagon at the level of the entablatures above the columns only to change again to become a Greek cross at the level of the pendentives of the vaults. Again, the base of the dome is circular in plan yet the lantern above it octagonal. The dome itself is supported by eight ribs forming a lattice similar to those found in mosques and Romanesque churches in Spain. To this superposition of - by the standards of convention - contradictory central plans is added an elliptical choir. The high altar, separated from the nave by a convex and concave archway receives natural light from a hidden dome, devices drawn from the other key Roman Baroque architect Gian Lorenzo Bernini.

== The dome ==
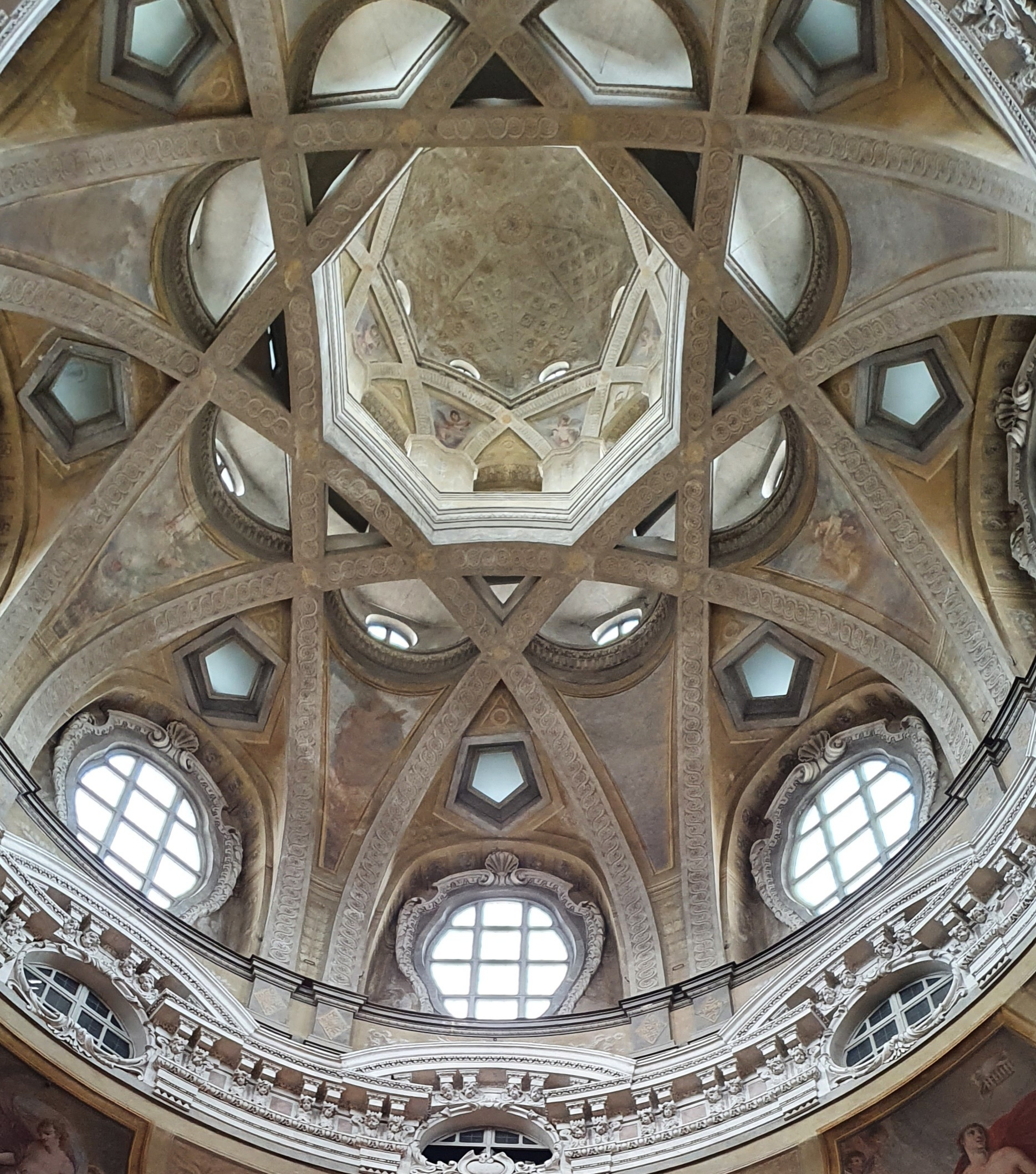
Faccia del diavolo (face of the devil)

Eight intersecting arches support the dome forming an eight-pointed star that resembles characteristics of mosques, with smaller windows adorning the areas between the arches. On the top, the lantern is surrounded by an octagonal shape.

The combination of these geometrical features and the reflection of light creates shapes that resemble faces, with the bottom window as the mouth, the smaller opening above comprising the nose, and the two upper windows as the eyes. Due to the position and shape of the eyes and mouth, these features have been called the “face of the devil” (“faccia del diavolo”).

== See also ==
- 17th-century Western domes
