= Guarino Guarini =

Italian architect, priest, mathematician and writer (1624–1683)

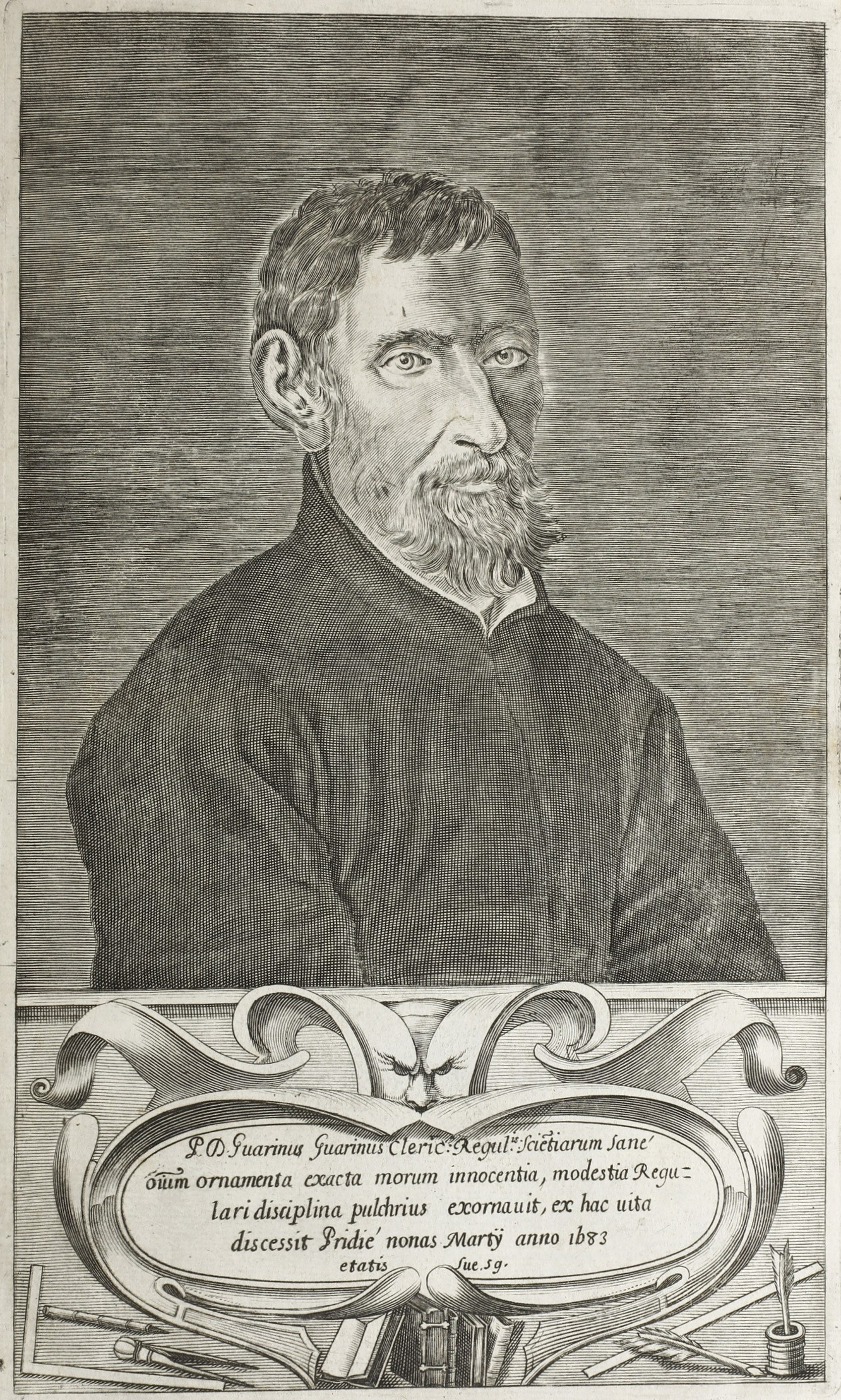
- Guarino Guarini
- Born: 17 January 1624; Modena, Duchy of Modena and Reggio
- Died: 6 March 1683 (aged 59); Milan, Duchy of Milan
- Known for: Chapel of the Holy Shroud; Royal Church of Saint Lawrence; Castle of Racconigi (with Filippo Juvarra, Pelagio Palagi and Giovanni Battista Borra); Palazzo Carignano
- Parent(s): Raimondo Guarini and Eugenia Guarini (née Marescotti)
- Scientific career
- Fields: Architecture, mathematics, astronomy and physics

Ecclesiastical career
- Religion: Christianity
- Church: Catholic Church
- Ordained: January 17, 1648

Camillo Guarino Guarini (17 January 1624 – 6 March 1683) was an Italian architect of the Piedmontese Baroque, active in Turin as well as Sicily, France and Portugal. He was a Theatine priest, mathematician, and writer. His work represents the ultimate achievement of Italian Baroque structural engineering, creating in stone what could be attempted today in reinforced concrete. Together with Francesco Borromini, Guarini is the most renowned exponent of the anti-classical, anti-Vitruvian trend that dominated Italian architecture after Michelangelo but increasingly lost ground from the late 17th century. His subtly designed buildings, crowned with daring and complex domes, were ignored in Italy outside Piedmont, but illustrations published in 1686 and again in Guarini’s treatise Architettura civile (1737) proved a fruitful source of inspiration in the development of south German and Austrian late Baroque and Rococo architecture.

== Early life and education ==
Camillo Guarino Guarini was born in Modena on 17 January 1624. He came from a deeply religious family; he and his four brothers all joined the Theatine Order. At the age of 15 he became a novice and was sent at the monastery of San Silvestro al Quirinale in Rome (1639–48), where he was able to study High Baroque architecture, in particular the work of Borromini, Gian Lorenzo Bernini and Pietro da Cortona. From Borromini, Guarini learned the use of complex geometry as a basis for floor plans. Borromini's second Roman church, Sant'Ivo alla Sapienza, was a star hexagon plan created by superimposing two equilateral triangles. Guarini used such a format in the presbytery dome of San Lorenzo in Turin.

Besides architecture Guarini received a thorough training in theology, philosophy and mathematics. The details of Guarini’s architectural training are not known, but in the excellently equipped libraries of his Order he presumably studied such well-known treatises as those of Serlio and Vignola.

In 1648 he returned to Modena as an ordained priest and two years later was appointed lecturer in philosophy at the Theatine College there. His career as an architect for the Order, which had a tradition of using its own members as architects, began in 1649 with the reconstruction of San Vincenzo, Modena, in collaboration with Giovanni Benedetto Castiglione.

Guarini rose quickly in the Theatine hierarchy, becoming first auditor, then superintendent of works, treasurer, lecturer in philosophy, procuratore. In 1655 he was elected Provost (preposito) of the Theatine house in Modena against the wishes of Alfonso IV d'Este, who was acting as Viceroy for his father, Francesco I d'Este, Duke of Modena: he forbade the appointment and banished Guarini from the city. After short sojourns in Parma and Guastalla (1656), Guarini’s movements are unknown until his arrival in Messina in 1660. Claims are often made that he travelled in Spain and Portugal during this period in connection with a scheme to build a church in Lisbon, but this cannot be proved.

== Early career, before 1666 ==
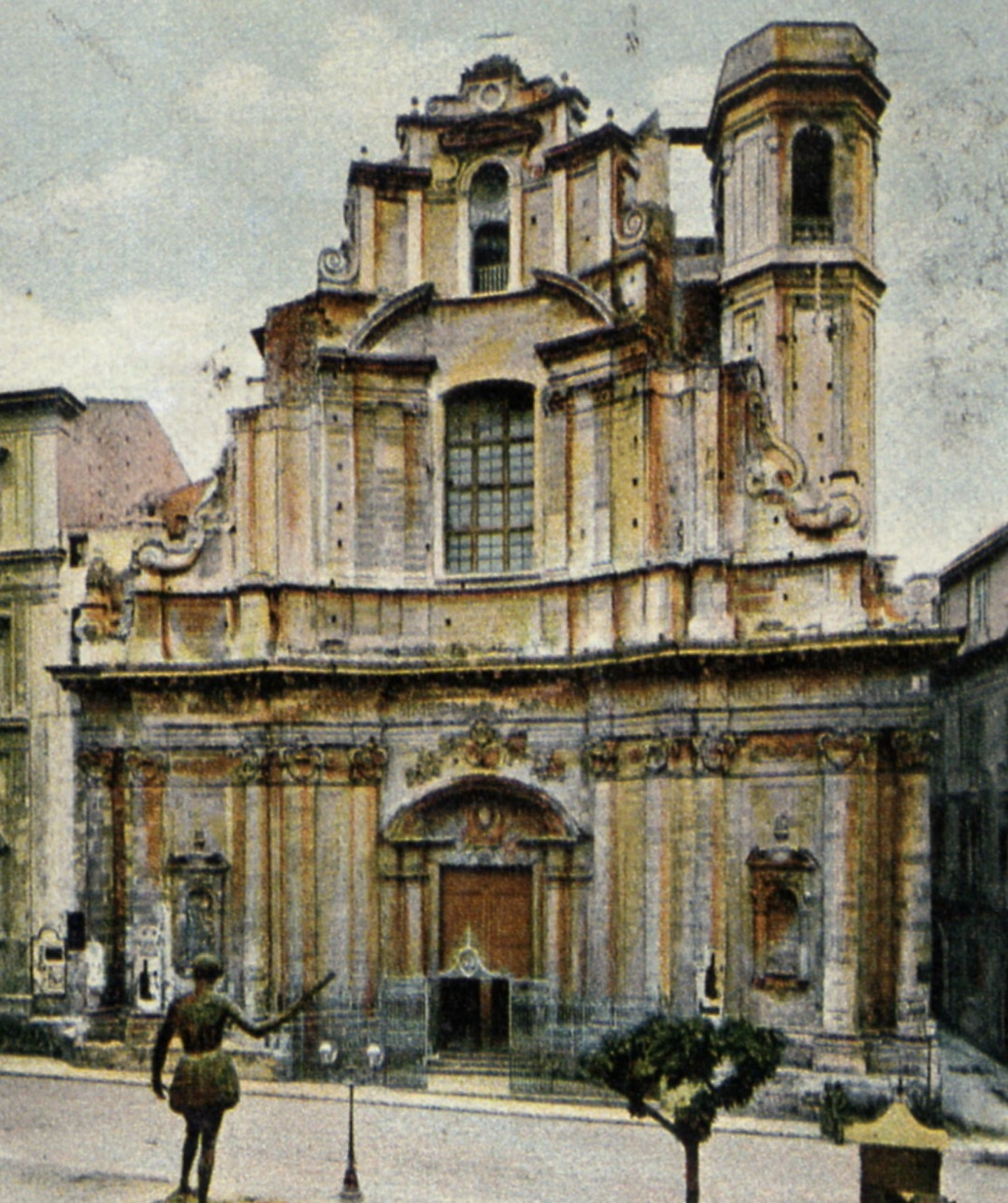
The Church of the Annunziata, before being destroyed by the 1908 Messina earthquake

In Messina, in addition to teaching activities, Guarini built the façade of Santa Maria Annunziata for his Order, placing it diagonally to the nave to conform with the building line of the street. The adjoining Theatine College is also attributed to him. A scheme for a church for the Somaschi Fathers in Messina is illustrated in Architettura civile, but there is no indication of its date, nor if it was ever built. If contemporary with the Annunziata, it already announced a number of themes that characterize his style, such as centrality, telescoped space and the idiosyncratic treatment of vaulting. During his time in Messina Guarini published his first literary work during, an elaborate political and poetic drama entitled La Pietà Trionfante.

In June 1662, Guarini received word that his mother was gravely ill and swiftly departed from Sicily to Modena to stay with her at the end of her life. He remained there for several months while also drafting plans for the façade of the Theatine church of San Vincenzo in Modena, but the project was never executed.

In November 1662 Guarini travelled to Paris at the invitation of his Order to design the church of Ste Anne-la-Royale. Although he incorporated the existing foundations of an oval church by the engineer Antonio Maurizio Valperga (fl 1626–67), he developed a completely independent design, again illustrated in Architettura civile. This had a Greek-cross plan extended by a polygonal choir chapel on the far side of the east arm. The central square bay of the plan was defined by four piers set at a diagonal of 45°, which supported a high drum with an arcaded walk lit by small lanterns. Above the drum was a double dome, the soffit of the lower one decorated with an interlace of flat ribs springing in pairs from plinths in a way that recalled the vaulting in Borromini’s chapel of the Re Magi (1660–64) at the Collegio di Propaganda Fide, Rome. At Ste Anne, however, the wide central octagon produced by the interlaced ribs was left open, enabling a smaller, truncated dome capped by a lantern to be seen through the oculus thus created. The façade, with its three-part curvature, was reminiscent of Borromini’s for San Carlo alle Quattro Fontane, Rome, although as this was not begun until 1665 (and with Borromini’s well-known fear of competitors it is unlikely that Guarini would have seen drawings) Guarini may well have devised the curved façade of Ste Anne-la-Royale independently. The church, his first ecclesiastical masterpiece, incorporated all the essential elements of his style: the geometric patterning of the dome, the autonomy of the volumetric components, openness to Gothic principles of construction, and receptivity to contemporary architecture in Rome.

During the construction of Sainte-Anne-la-Royale, Guarini was appointed as a lecturer of theology at the Theatine School in Paris. His travel in France gave him the opportunity to contact not only many Gothic cathedrals but also with the work of Desargue on projective geometry. "It was this new geometry that supplied the scientific basis for Guarini's daring structures, particularly of domes."

The construction of Sainte Anne began on the twenty-eighth of November, 1662 in a prominent site facing the Louvre on the quai of the Seine. Four years into the construction, both transepts of the church were nearing completion. Financial strains, as well as monetary and material resources, became increasingly irregular, putting the project in jeopardy. In a fit of resignation, Guarini sharply accused the superior of the Theatine Order of mishandling resources and abandoned the project, leaving swiftly for Turin in the autumn of 1666.

== Mature and late work, 1666 and after ==
=== Ecclesiastical buildings ===
When Guarini arrived in Turin towards the end of 1666 he submitted a completely new design for San Lorenzo, the first stone of which had been laid in 1634. It originally had a Latin-cross plan, variously attributed to Ascanio Vitozzi, Carlo di Castellamonte and Carlo Morello (fl c. 1630–60). Progress was slow, and there are records of payments for work on it as late as 1661.

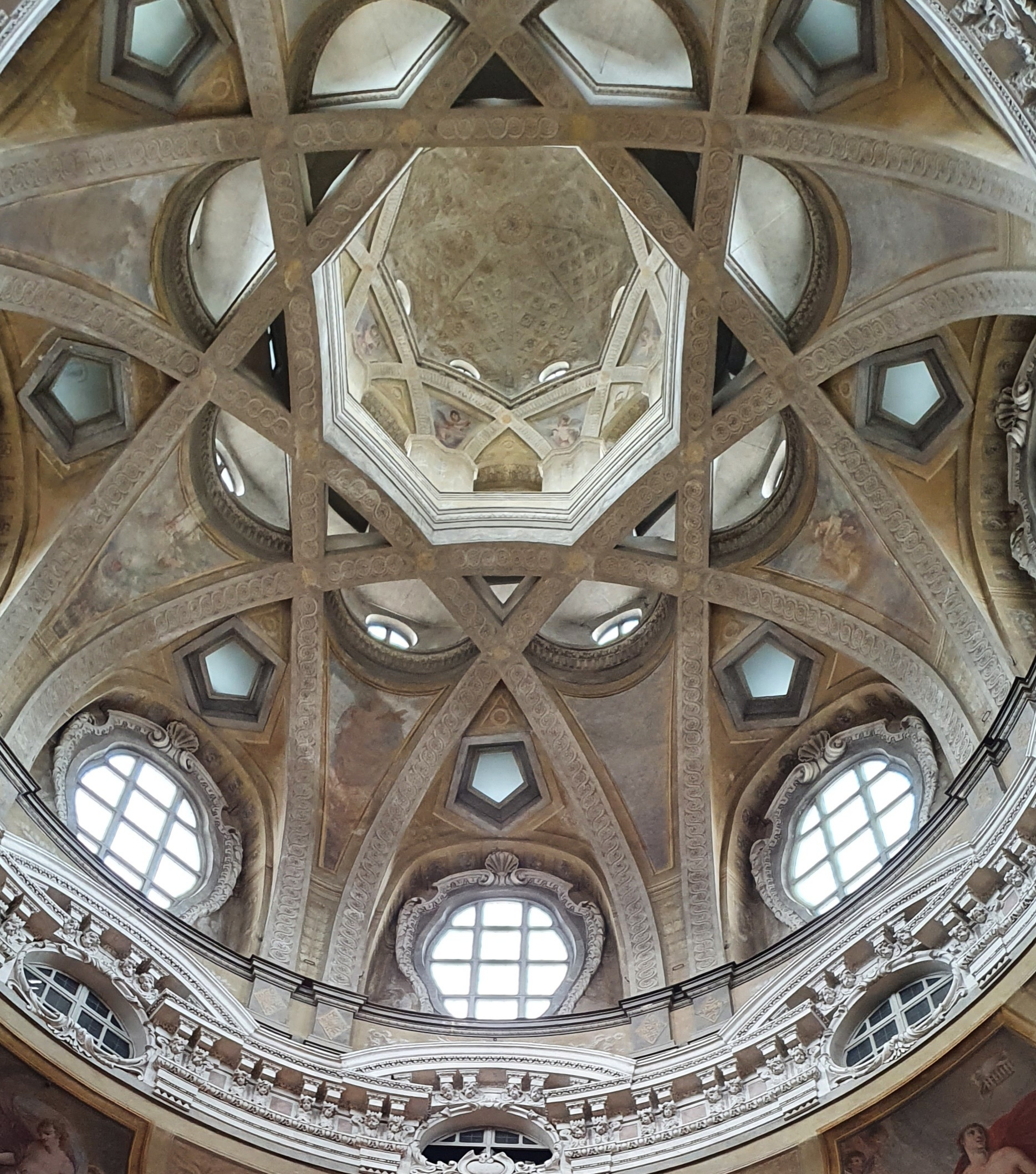
The cupola of San Lorenzo

Work was begun on Guarini’s scheme in 1668, when he was appointed the architect. Except for remnants of the outer walls, he had the body of the previous structure destroyed to make way for his own design, planned as a centralized nave set in a square frame, with a small presbytery to the east backed by a retrochoir. Into the central space intrude eight convex wall elements, pierced at ground level by large Serlianas framing altars. Four of these convex elements, on the cardinal points, are smoothly curved; the other four, located diagonally, have flat faces and sweep up, like huge chamfered piers, to form concave pendentives. They appear to support a cornice ring (itself pierced by eight oval openings) and drum, from the lower level of which springs a network of hyperbolic vaulting ribs, criss-crossing to create a diaphanous dome and rosette-like geometric mesh. The cupola of the lantern, also embellished with a network of ribs, is visible through an octagonal opening at the top. The surfaces between the ribs of the dome are broken up with windows of different shapes and sizes, creating a mysterious fusion of light and abstract linear grid. The small dome over the high altar has a similar, simplified structure. Guarini’s surface modelling gives the impression that the enormous thrusts of the superstructure are ultimately being channelled to earth via the slender columns of the diagonal Serlianas at ground-level. The real task of load-bearing, however, is sustained by an unseen deep structure of massive brick arches, buttressed by equally massive squinches, that spring at high level from points within the chamfered protrusions.

The inspiration for this extraordinary design seems to be twofold: Gothic and Islamic. In Architettura civile Guarini referred to the contrast between Gothic and Classical art, the aim of the former being ‘to erect buildings that were in fact very strong, but would seem weak and as though they needed a miracle to keep them standing’. The Islamic influence is seen in Guarini’s diaphanous dome, where the parabolic ribs create a pattern similar to that of the domes over the mihrab in the Great Mosque at Córdoba, albeit on a much larger scale; Guarini also cut out some of the infill web and placed a lantern on the ribwork of the open central octagon.

In May 1668, Charles Emmanuel II, Duke of Savoy named him Royal Engineer and Mathematician. The design skills evinced by Guarini at San Lorenzo prompted Charles-Emanuel, to appoint him, by a patent dated 19 May 1668, engineer for the chapel of the Holy Shroud, Turin. Work on the project had been under way intermittently since 1607 to a design by Carlo di Castellamonte, superseded in 1657 by one from Bernardino Quadri (fl c. 1647–60). The location chosen for this reliquary chapel, joined both to the west wing of the new Royal Palace and to the east end of the cathedral, was meant to symbolize the unity of Church and State, or the divine favour and recognition bestowed on the House of Savoy.

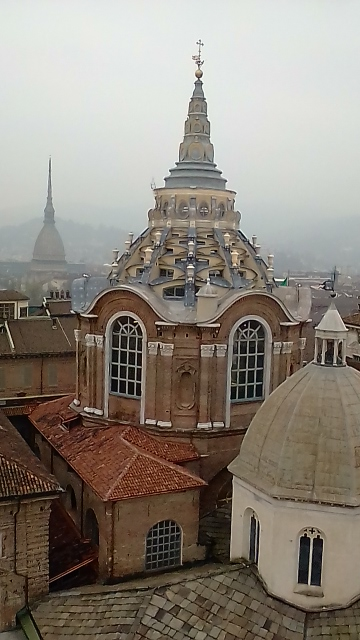
External view of the Chapel of the Holy Shroud

When Guarini took over as head of works, the circular structure of the chapel, elevated high above the cathedral floor, had been completed up to the entablature of a giant order. It was faced with black marble, and its three portals, one leading to the palace, the other two leading to the stairs from the cathedral aisles, were already in place, as was the huge window to the central nave through which the relic of the Holy Shroud could be seen. The appointment of a new architect at this advanced stage of construction was due to major structural problems, which Guarini solved by taking the chapel walls down to the lower orders and superimposing a curved intermediate zone articulated by three flat, two-dimensional arches spanning between the portals. The abstract Trinitarian symbolism of the equilateral triangle inscribed by these arches is reflected in the three circular vestibules he introduced in front of the portals, projecting into the central circular space. These vestibules were each designed like a small monopteros, with shallow triangular vaulting supported by three groups of three free-standing black marble columns. The vestibule leading from the palace is only partially visible, because it is sunk into the wall. Guarini’s design for the capitals of the giant order incorporates thorns and nails, symbols of the Passion. The dark, windowless cylinder of this lower zone creates a grave-like atmosphere that contrasts intensely with the conical dome above: made of light-coloured stone, it is pierced by a filigree of windows admitting a flood of light—an overwhelming symbolism for death vanquished. The dome is formed by a series of segmental ribs. At the lowest level these spring from the heads of six large arched windows that light the drum. From the crowns of the first row of ribs the next row springs, spanning between the crowns. This sequence is repeated six times, creating tiers of arches of diminishing height and, in plan, a series of staggered hexagons. With an impression of height increased by the diminishing perspective in the dome, the overall effect is of strong upward movement, as if following the path of Resurrection towards a seemingly free-floating 12-pointed star at the apex, with the dove of the Holy Spirit. From the outside only the upper parts of the chapel are visible, and there Guarini introduced a further element: a tall, pointed three-tiered lantern on a stepped base. The oval windows of this pagoda-like construction serve to provide a halo of light for the dove of the Holy Spirit, the culmination of the bright celestial zone above presiding over the dark, restless zones below. At Santa Sindone, Guarini once more displayed his propensity for concealing the structural bases of his design. The bird’s nest of ascending ribs that constitutes the dome is in fact supported by powerful buttresses, visible as such externally but read within only as the vertical spines that bisect the openings created by the superimposed segmental ribs.

In these years Guarini designed also a number of longitudinal churches, including the Immacolata Concezione, Turin (begun 1673), which was first attributed to Guarini by Onorato Derossi in Nuova guida per la città di Torino (Turin, 1781), and others known only from engravings. These include designs for San Filippo Neri, Turin (unexecuted; the church of this name that collapsed in 1714 was to a substitute plan of 1683 by Michelangelo Garove), and another for Santa Maria della Divina Provvidenza, Lisbon (destroyed in the earthquake of 1755), intended for the Theatines. The latter’s date is uncertain, but the engravings of it in Disegni d’architettura (Turin, 1686 ) are dedicated to Fra Antonio Ardizone Spinola (1609–97), who established the Order in Lisbon in the early 1650s. The design of Santa Maria della Divina Provvidenza epitomized Guarini’s dynamic reinterpretation of the Counter-Reformation church type, which was primarily responsible for his high standing with Baroque and Rococo architects north of the Alps. The Roman model for this type, Il Gesù, has a Latin-cross plan, a dome over the crossing and wide nave with side chapels, interconnected by narrow passages, the nave walls being composed of wide arches and pilaster-faced piers. All these elements were present in the Divina Provvidenza, but Guarini transformed the schema by substituting spaces defined by ovals and circles for those previously defined by straight lines. The two bays of the nave were intersecting ovals, each capped by a quadripartite dome with a lantern above. The presbytery was two-thirds of a circle in plan; and the crossing, between two elongated ellipses that served as transepts, was roofed by a huge dome and an octagonal lantern. The piers between each bay, from the entrance end to the presbytery, were canted outwards to induce a continuous undulation in the walls; the ceiling also undulated, as the bay vaults interpenetrated with soft curves at the lines of intersection; and the giant pilasters, their trabeation articulating the nave walls, undulated as well. They were components of what Guarini termed in his architectural treatise ‘the Supreme Corinthian order, which I make undulating’. The all-pervading sinuosity of the order is extrapolated from the corkscrew columns found in Old St Peter’s, Rome, which were believed to be relics of Solomon's Temple in Jerusalem. A ‘complete Salomonic Order’ had in fact been pioneered, on paper at least, by an older contemporary of Guarini’s, Fra Juan Rizi, a Spanish Benedictine monk whom he may have met on his travels. These peculiarities were not intended to be capricious but were the logical outcome of Guarini’s basic conception of the interpenetration and fusion of bodies. The dissolution of prismatic mass in Guarini’s designs is perhaps his most important contribution to architectural history.

=== Secular buildings ===
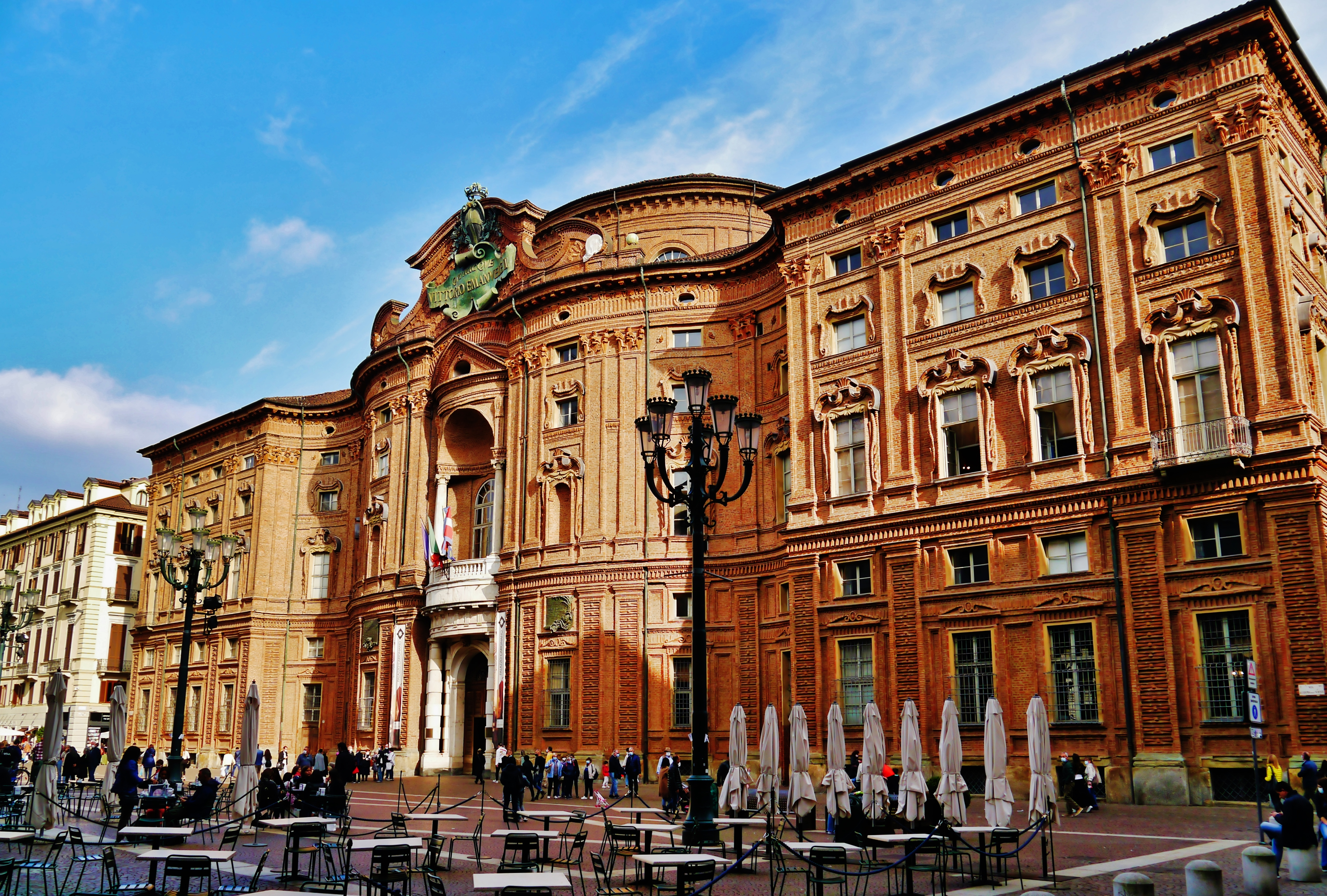
Façade of Palazzo Carignano

Guarini’s most renowned achievement in secular architecture is the Palazzo Carignano in Turin, regarded as one of the finest urban palaces of the second half of the 17th century in Italy. His patron was Prince Emmanuel Philibert, Prince of Carignano, descendant of a cadet branch of the ruling dynasty but at that time heir to Victor Amadeus II, Duke of Savoy. This position obliged Emanuele to have a suitable residence, and in 1679 Guarini was commissioned to build on a site outside the medieval walls of Turin. The palace was originally designed to have four wings around a large courtyard, but it was completed in 1683 as an open three-winged composition; decorating and finishing continued well into the 18th century. Four stages in the planning of the Palazzo Carignano exist in draft form (Turin, Archivio di Stato) and have often been published. The final scheme, which was the one built, shows a layout with a central block facing a piazza and set between two straight side wings running back. The façade of the central block is formed with two sinuous S-curves. In the middle is a tall, oval cylinder, which is joined by sweeping counter-curves to the rectilinear end bays of the wings. Two great staircases wind around the central oval pavilion like arms. They connect to a hexagonal salon on the piano nobile, which in turn leads to the oval grand salone, with a magnificent balcony over the main entrance. This design gives the impression of dramatic conflict between the architectural masses: the central block, wedged between the two side blocks, seems to undulate in slow motion. The uniformity of the brick façade is interrupted by the central portal and the grand balcony above, which are both made from brilliant white stone and seem to burst from the centre impelled by a force exerted from the core of the building at the point of greatest tension. This type of curved inflection was an innovation in Italian Baroque palace design, although Bernini had featured an oval pavilion connected to side bays in his first project for the east front of the Louvre (1664), which Guarini may have seen during his time in Paris. At the Palazzo Carignano the medium of brick was exploited to the utmost, both in the handling of the masses and in the extraordinary detailing.

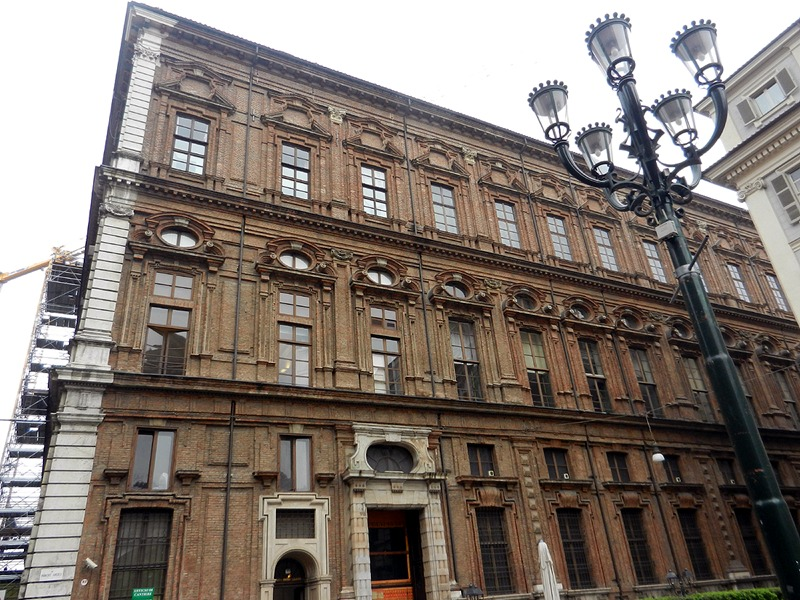
Façade of the Collegio dei Nobili in Turin

Guarini’s other major secular building in Turin, the Collegio dei Nobili (begun 1679; now the Palazzo dell’Accademia delle Scienze), is very different in character from the Palazzo Carignano. It was commissioned by the Dowager Duchess Marie Jeanne of Savoy, to be used for the education of young aristocrats by Jesuits. The building was never completed, but a Neoclassical wing was added c. 1800: Guarini’s touch may now be seen on two elevations only of the U-shaped building. The Collegio dei Nobili has three floors with pairs of large windows set between pilasters. Above the large windows are smaller ones, to enable intermediate floors to be constructed, if required, without disturbing the elevation. The storeys are separated by broad entablatures. Like the Palazzo Carignano, the Collegio is built of brick, but the corner pilasters are emphasized with stone rustication. The ornaments of the window-frames are in moulded brick and cast deep shadows on the wall. The large windows of the two upper levels are very unusual in being placed directly above the cornices without balustrades. As the purpose of the building was to house a school, not a prince, no storey is marked out as the piano nobile.

Guarini died in Milan on 6 March 1683. In architecture, his successors include Filippo Juvarra, and Juvarra's pupil Bernardo Vittone.

== Theory and writings ==
=== Mathematical and philosophical works ===
Throughout his working life Guarini kept up a steady output of literature at the rate of a book every other year. His treatises cover a multitude of subjects, including architecture, mathematics and astronomy. In 1665, he published in Paris his Placita Philosophica (A System of Philosophy), a large mathematical-philosophical treatise divided into eight parts. Guarini published this work while he was a professor of theology in Paris. It is a comprehensive, pragmatic system, spanning the fields of logic, anatomy, biology, astronomy, physics, theology and metaphysics. Guarino's Placita belongs to the school of thought usually referred to as Baroque Scholasticism. It also shares strong similarities to Nicolas Malebranche's Occasionalism. The content of the Placita indicates that Guarini attentively followed scientific developments of the era. In some cases, he endorsed them - for instance, Galileo’s discovery that celestial objects are material and corruptible.

Although, following the views of Aristotle, Guarino denies the existence of a vacuum, he describes and discusses Torricelli's barometer and barometric experiment with a glass tube closed at the top and filled with mercury. Guarini's Placita includes an extensive section on theoretical astronomy. He defends the Ptolemaic system dismissing both the Copernican and Tycho Brahe’s systems. He displays a good knowledge of modern scholarship and quotes frequently from Johannes Kepler’s and Galileo's work. The French astronomer and Catholic priest Ismaël Bullialdus is also mentioned numerous times in conjunction with Kepler, particularly when discussing the eccentricity of planetary orbits. Guarino gives a lengthy description of the motion of planets and the Sun according to the geocentric model. He determines fairly accurately the distance between the Moon and the Earth and concludes that Galileo's observation of the change in lunar distance is due to a change in velocity; that when the Moon appears closer to the Earth, it moves faster. Guarini attempts to discover the reason for this, using Euclidean geometry, triangulation and quadratura (quadrature), the available methods at a time that still predate the development of calculus and Newton's law of universal gravitation. Prior to the publication of Newton's Principia, Guarini theorizes that the velocity of light is a constant and the movement of light is a perturbance or wave. Guarini also theorizes that light travels from the Sun to the Earth in a vacuum (coniuncta soli est: unde vacua luce) until it reaches the atmosphere creating heat, wind and the movement of the ocean.

His main work, entitled Euclides adauctus et methodicus (1671), is a treatise on descriptive geometry in thirty-five books. The first three books reintroduce arguments of a philosophical nature already addressed in the Placita Philosophica regarding in particular the existence of indivisibles. Guarini comments on the works of Bonaventura Cavalieri, praising his method of indivisibles. He cites both the objections to this method used by Mario Bettinus in the Epilogus Planimetricus and that of Paul Guldin in De centro gravitatis solidorum, as well as the authors who appreciated the mathematical proofs, such as Ismaël Bullialdus in De lineis spiralibus and Vincenzo Viviani in De maximis et minimis. Guarini's conclusion is articulated in nine points and ends with the judgment that Cavalieri did not provide actual and evident proof because in his method he goes from one species to another: the indivisible segments (of the first species) form a surface (of the second species) and this kind of proportion between figures of different species is not permitted in geometry. In books IV-XII Guarini presents and proves the propositions set forth by Euclid in books I-VII and X of the Elements. Books XXII and XXXIII are devoted to solid geometry, the intersection of planes and the inscription of the five regular polyhedra in the sphere, a theme addressed by Euclid in his books XI, XII and XIII. In the final two books of the Euclides adauctus and in the Appendix, added to the work shortly after 1671, Guarini deals with the volumes of bodies contained by plane surfaces, such as pyramids and prisms, and by curved surfaces.

Guarini's strong mathematical background is evident in his architectural work. As he states in his Euclides adauctus et methodicus: «Thaumaturga Mathematicorum miraculorum insigni, vereque Regali architectura coruscat» - 'The magic of wondrous mathematicians shines brightly in the marvelous and truly regal architecture'.

=== Architectural works ===
In addition to his writings on mathematics, Guarini published works on architecture. In the mid 1670s he published a treatise entitled Il modo di misurare le fabbriche (1674) and a book on military engineering, the Trattato di fortificatione che hora si usa in Fiandra, Francia, et Italia (1676).

Three years after his death, the Theatines released for publication a collection of his architectural designs, engraved by various hands, under the title Disegni d’architettura civile et ecclesiastica. It had no accompanying text but included 33 plates illustrating Guarini’s schemes, which helped to spread the knowledge of his architectural style abroad.

In the 1730s the Theatines invoked the help of the architect Bernardo Antonio Vittone to reissue these plates and several more, together with Guarini’s unpublished manuscripts for a treatise on architecture, surveying and drawing. It came out under the title of Architettura civile (1737). Much of the book is highly technical in character, although even here Guarini’s characteristic preoccupations are evident, as in his declaration that ‘vaults are the main thing in architecture’. One of the most interesting aspects of the work is the insight it affords into Guarini’s views on aesthetics, for example: ‘Architecture has as its purpose the gratification of the senses’ (I.iii.7). He went on to say that those people whose senses were to be thus gratified must be free of prejudice and artistically sophisticated. He noted that taste varied from age to age: ‘Roman architecture formerly displeased the Goths, and Gothic architecture displeases us’ (III.iii), but he could not repress his admiration for the skills of medieval architects in dissimulating the statical bases of their structures. The ultimate implication is that the rules could be changed and the orders were simply handy components, not the basic modules of proportion.

== Critical reception and posthumous reputation ==
Guarini’s diaphanous domes, his superimposition of apparently unrelated units in his centralized churches and the interpenetration of spaces in his longitudinal ones, together with his manipulation of statical forces in overt and deep structures, found no imitators among his contemporaries in Italy. The publication of Architettura civile inspired a modest Guarini revival in Piedmont (most notable in the work of Vittone), but later in the 18th century the rise of Neoclassicism in Italy led to the revilement of Guarini’s architecture. This attitude is apparent in Francesco Milizia’s scornful attack on Guarini in Le vite de’ più celebri architetti (Rome, 1768). The reaction in the German lands was different: Guarini's Architettura civile was widely circulated in eighteenth-century Austria and Germany, contributing to the development of such architects as Johann Lukas von Hildebrandt, Johann Bernhard Fischer von Erlach, and Balthasar Neumann.

Johann Bernhard Fischer von Erlach’s Holy Trinity Church (1694–1707), Salzburg, has a façade that distinctly recalls the massing of the Palazzo Carignano. What began in Austria continued in Bohemia with Christoph Dientzenhofer (Obořiště, Pauline Abbey, 1699–1712) and culminated in Franconia, where Balthasar Neumann’s pilgrimage church of the Assumption, Vierzehnheiligen (1740s), would have been unthinkable without the precedent of the splayed piers and interpenetrating spaces of Guarini’s longitudinal churches. A new appreciation of Baroque architecture, which began in the late 19th century, has led to a re-evaluation of Guarini’s work, which included a week-long conference on his life, work and influence held at Turin in 1968.

== Publications ==
- La Pietà trionfante, tragi-comedia morale (in Italian). Messina: Giacomo Mattei. 1660.
- Placita philosophica (in Latin). Paris: Denys Thierry. 1665.
- Euclides adauctus et methodicus mathematicaque universalis (in Latin). Turin: typis B. Zapatae. 1671.
- Modo di misurare le fabbriche (in Italian). Turin: eredi Gianelli. 1674.
- Compendio della sfera celeste (in Italian). Turin: Giorgio Colonna. 1675.
- Trattato di Fortificatione (in Italian). Turin: eredi Gianelli. 1676.
- Leges temporum, et planetarum quibus civilis, et astronomici temporis lapsus primi mobilis, et errantium decursus ordinantur atque in tabulas digeruntur ad longitudinem Taurinensem gr. 30.46' et latitudinem gr. 44.49' (in Latin). Turin: eredi Carlo Giannelli. 1678.
- Cœlestis mathematicæ pars I^{a} et II^{a} (in Latin). Milan: ex typographia Ludovici Montiae. 1683.
- Disegni d'architettura civile, et ecclesiastica (in Italian). Turin: eredi Gianelli. 1686.
- Architettura civile divisa in cinque trattati, opera postuma (in Italian). 2 vols. Turin: appresso G. Mairesse all'insegna di Santa Teresa di Gesù. 1737.

== Architectural works ==
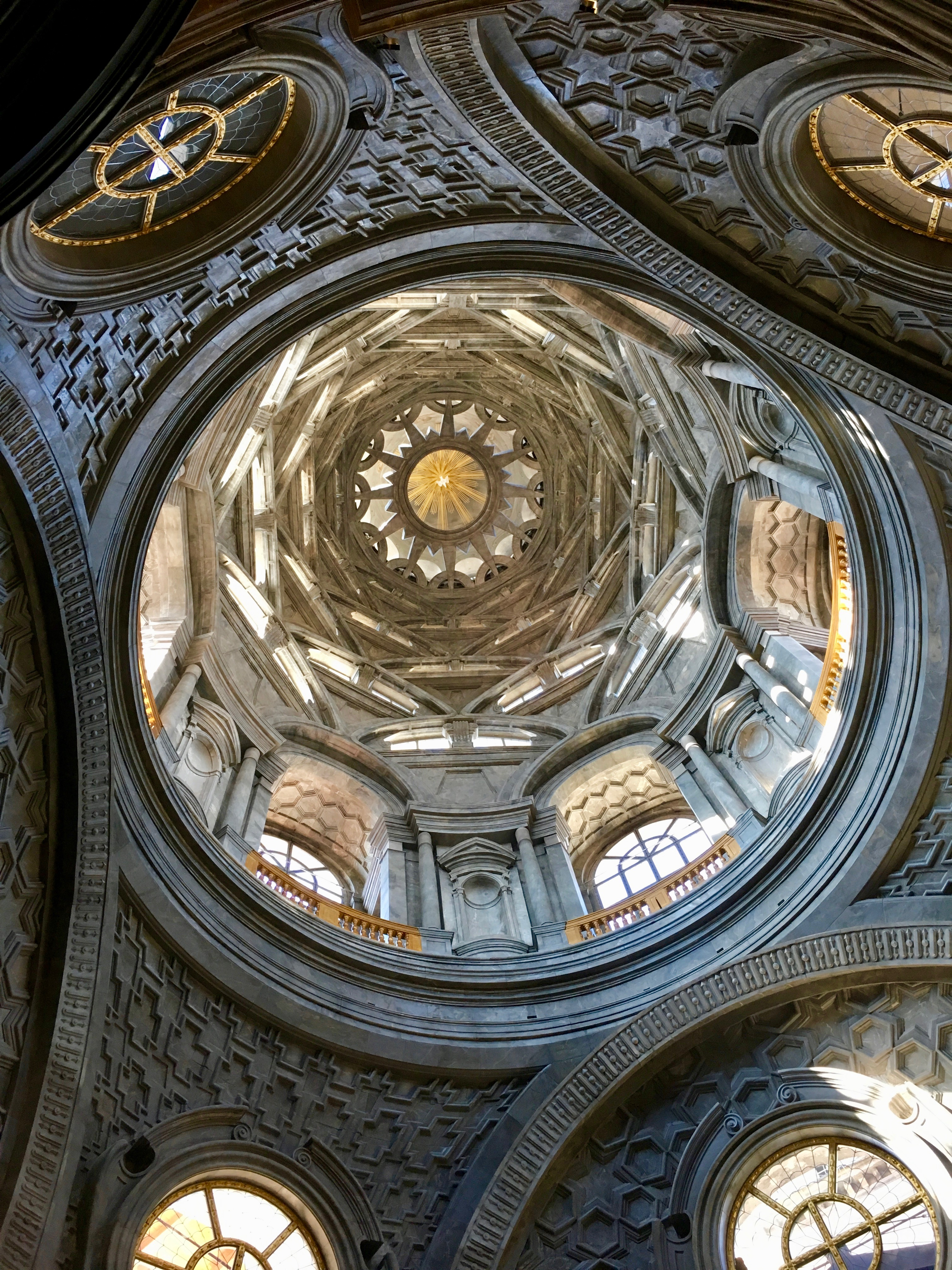
Cupola of the Chapel of Holy Shroud in Turin

- Church of the Somaschi Fathers (Messina, unbuilt project)
- Façade of Santissima Annunziata and adjacent Theatine palace (Messina, destroyed in the 1908 earthquake)
- Sainte-Anne-la-Royale (1662, destroyed in 1823)
- Santa Maria della Divina Provvidenza (Lisbon, destroyed by the 1755 earthquake)
- San Filippo Neri (completed by Juvarra)
- Colegio dei Nobili (1678, Turin)
- Chapel of the Holy Shroud (1668–94, Turin)
- Royal Church of San Lorenzo (1668–87, Turin)
- Castle of Racconigi (1676–84, Racconigi)
- Palazzo Carignano (1679–85, Turin)
- Santuario della Consolata (restored later by others)
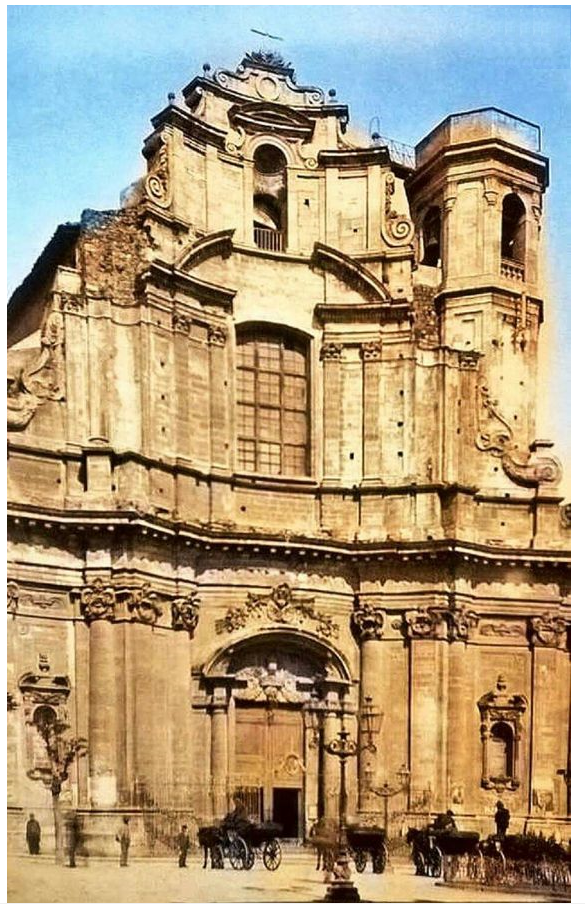
Santissima Annunziata dei Teatini in Messina

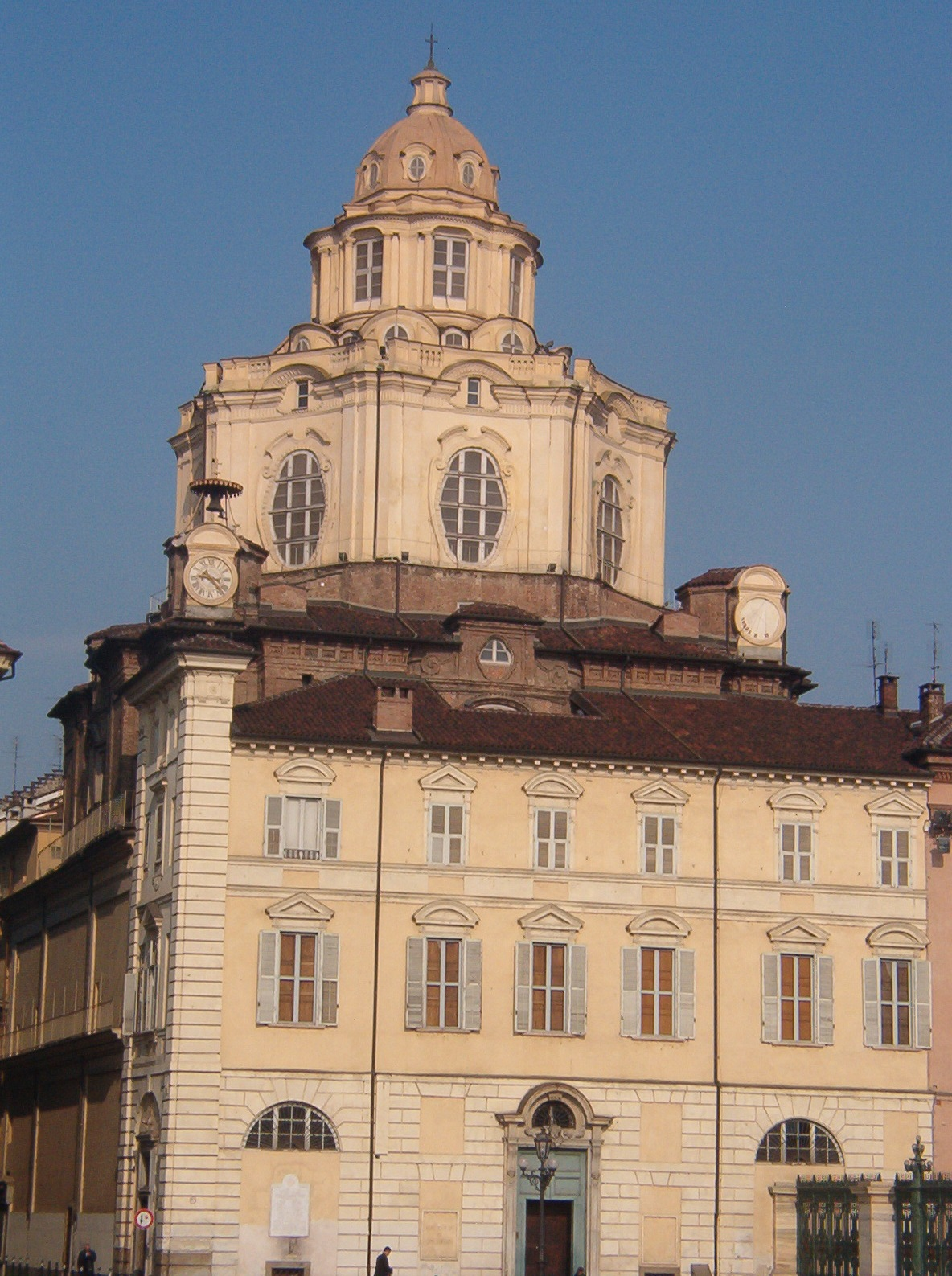
San Lorenzo, Turin

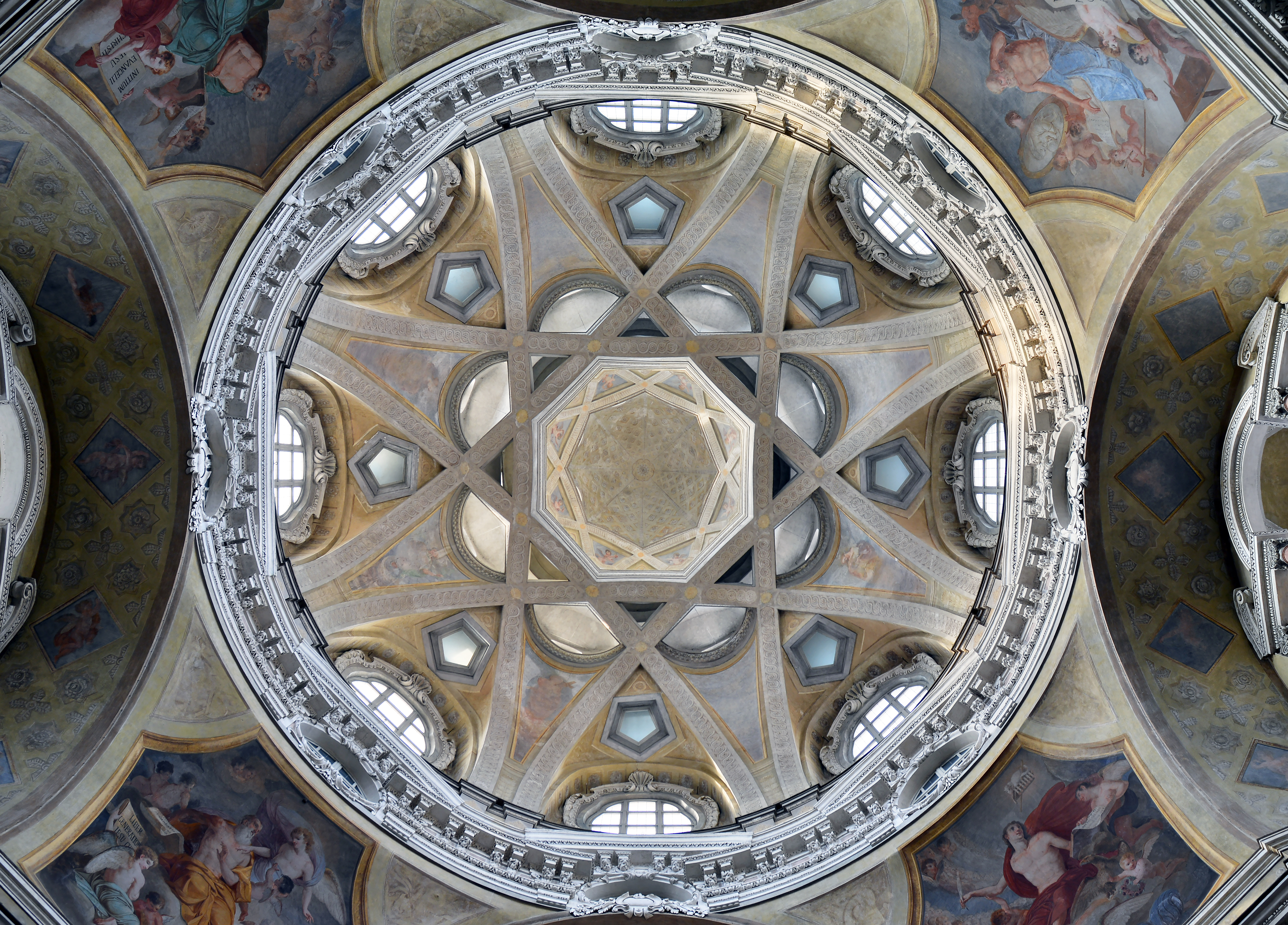
Dome of the church of San Lorenzo in Turin

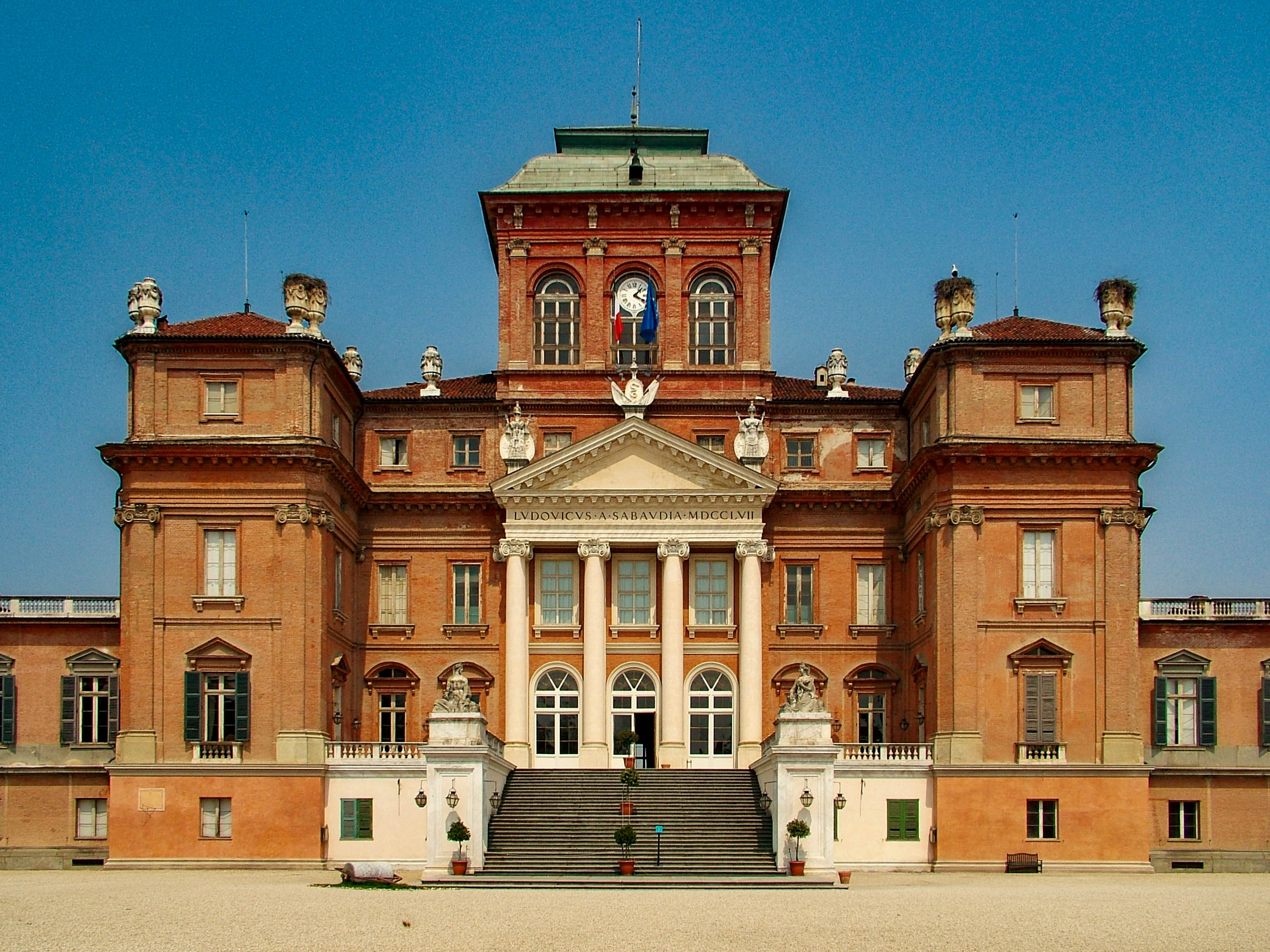
Castle of Racconigi

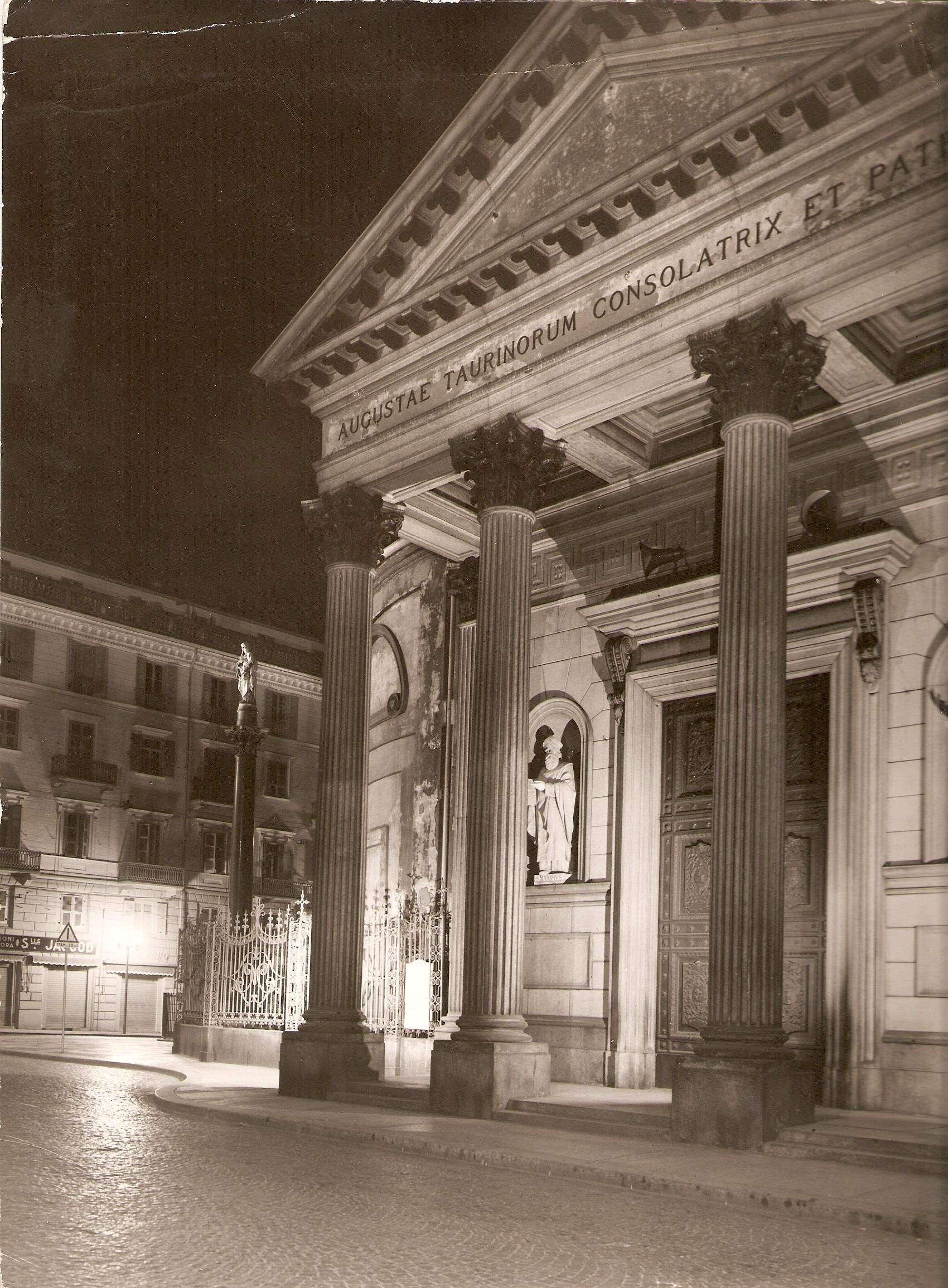
Façade of the Santuario della Consolata in Turin

== References in modern culture ==
Guarino Guarini is the subject of a composition, Guarini, the Master, written in 2004 by Italian composer Lorenzo Ferrero.
