= 17th-century Western domes =

Aspect of architectural history

Domes built in the 17th century by the Western world, broadly defined, used traditional geometric and proportional techniques for masonry domes and lanterns and relied on graphical or empirical solutions to the geometric problems created by oval domes. In the 17th century, analytical approaches were developed and the ideal shape for a dome was debated, but these approaches were often considered too theoretical to be used in construction. From the late 17th century, there was a shift away from proportional rules to a culture of testing.

Traditional Orthodox church domes were used in hundreds of Orthodox and Uniate wooden churches in the seventeenth and eighteenth centuries and Tatar wooden mosques in Poland were domed central plan structures with adjacent minarets. Bulbous domes became popular in Central Germany, Southern Germany, and Austria in the 17th century, and influenced those in Poland and Eastern Europe in the Baroque period. Onion spires are predominant in Bavarian country churches and onion domes over Bavarian pilgrimage churches may indicate influence from Prague.

In Spain, false vaults made of wood or reed and covered with plaster were in chapel domes to give the appearance of stone construction. An anti-seismic technique for building called quincha was adapted from local Peruvian practice for domes and became universally adopted along the Peruvian coast. A similar lightweight technique was used in eastern Sicily after earthquakes struck in the seventeenth and eighteenth centuries. In Naples, it was customary in the 17th and 18th centuries to cover domes with polychrome majolica tilework influenced by Arabic art.

Oval plan churches spread outside of Rome following Vignola's innovation with the church of Sant'Anna dei Palafrenieri. Guarino Guarini established the oval dome as a reconciliation of the longitudinal plan church favored by the liturgy of the Counter-Reformation and the centralized plan favored by idealists. He also originated the idea of a large oculus in a solid dome revealing a second dome.

== Developments ==
The construction of domes in the seventeenth century relied primarily on empirical techniques and oral traditions rather than the architectural treatises of the times, which avoided practical details. This was adequate for domes up to medium size, with diameters in the range of 12 to 20 meters (39 to 66 ft). Materials were considered homogeneous and rigid, with compression taken into account and elasticity ignored. The weight of materials and the size of the dome were the key references. Lateral tensions in a dome were counteracted with horizontal rings of iron, stone, or wood incorporated into the structure.

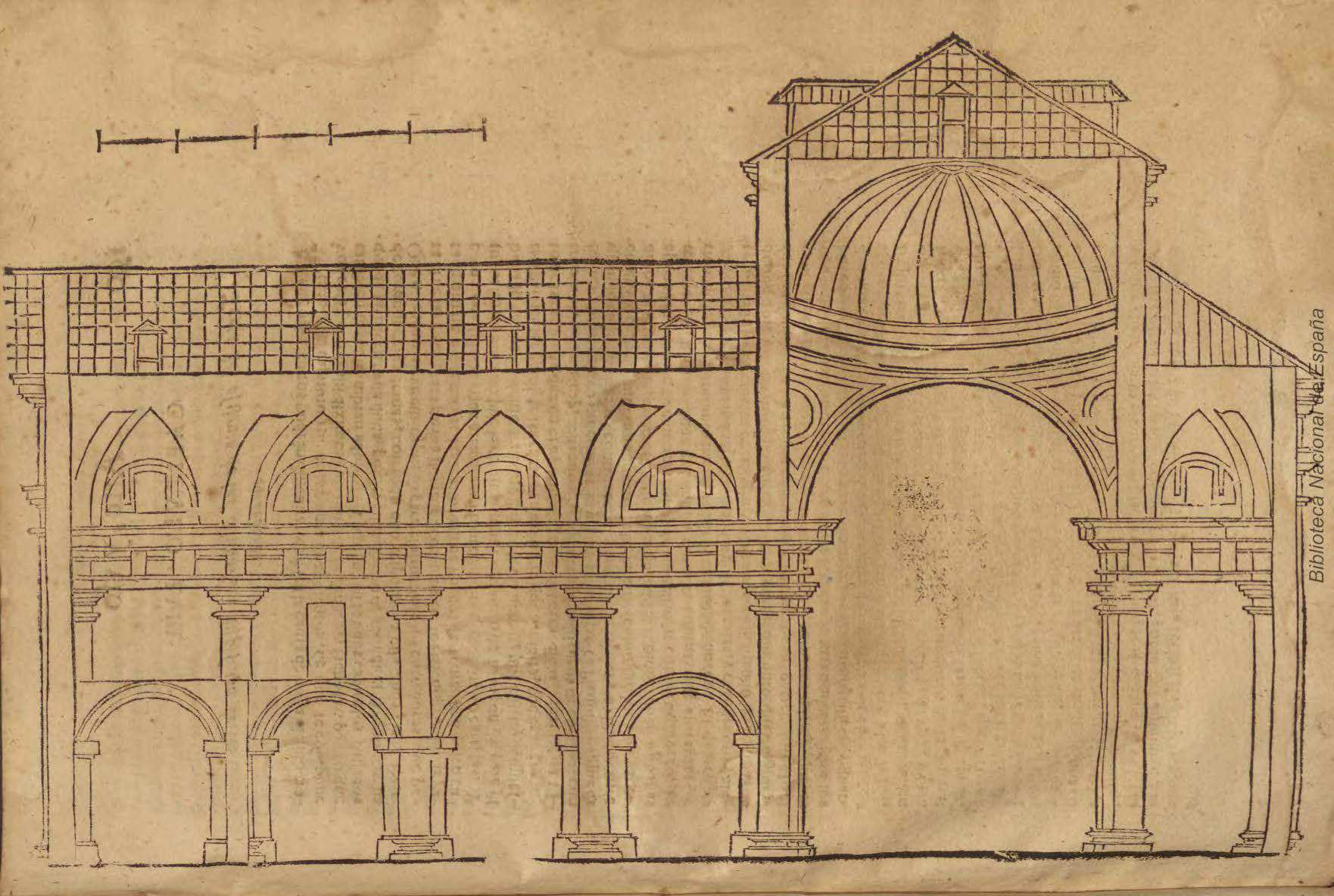
Illustration in Arte y Uso de la Arquitectura by Fray Lorenzo

A treatise by Vincenzo Scamozzi from 1615 gives examples of a typology of vaults and domes, but not a general and thorough theory. A two volume treatise by Fray Lorenzo, published in 1639 and 1665, recommended against the use of heavy and expensive stone for domes in favor of a hybrid system of brick shells covered by timber shells, as structurally independent elements. He complimented the use of wooden domes over chapels in Spain, made to look like stone on the outside, as safe and strong.

In the seventeenth century, many Renaissance and Baroque elliptical and oval plan domes were built over rectangular naves, using brick in Italy and stone in Spain. Later German oval domes in the Rococo style used different combinations of geometry. Oval domes often incorporated both elliptical and oval or semicircular curves and this ambiguity is reflected in the architectural literature. Builders relied on graphical or empirical solutions to such geometric problems. In 1640, mathematician Paul Guldin established that the "elongated semicircle" of traditional practice is an ellipse.

Over the course of the seventeenth century, developments in mathematics and the study of statics led to a more precise formalization of the ideas of the traditional constructive practices of arches and vaults. Robert Hooke published a Latin anagram in 1675, deciphered only after his death, indicating that the perfect shape for an arch to resist a given load was the inversion of the shape a flexible cord assumes under such a load, but he was unable to define this catenary curve mathematically. He had proposed to the Royal Society in 1671 that the perfect dome shape was the cubico-parabolical conoid.

Although some recommendations for the profile of a dome can be found in treatises from earlier centuries, the traditional geometric and proportional techniques for masonry domes and lanterns were first detailed in 1694 by Carlo Fontana in his famous treatise Il Tempio Vaticano e sua Origine. Fontana explains the proportions of a dome based on the dome's internal diameter, the thickness and height of the drum, the internal diameter of the oculus, and the height of the piers. The thickness of the dome at its base is recommended to be three-fourths of the drum's thickness, with the dome's intrados and extrados following different circular curves to become thinner toward the top.

There was no single proportional rule for the sizing of the pillar supports beneath a dome in the second half of the seventeenth century and a wide variety of proportions were used, based on previously completed work. This contributed to a shift away from proportional rules to a culture of testing from the late seventeenth and into the eighteenth century. Mathematician and astronomer Philippe de La Hire created rules of pillar proportion with a mechanical hypothesis for the sizing of imposts in his 1695 Traité de mecanique. Dutch physicist Pieter van Musschenbroek performed experiments on the resistance of metal ropes, which were praised by Giovanni Poleni.

== Dutch Republic ==
A domed octagon garrison church was built at Willenstad by Maurice, Prince of Orange, from 1597 to 1607. The brick octagonal church, twenty meters wide, was built at the center of the fortified town.

The city of Maastricht, jointly ruled by Liège and Brabant since the 13th century, was conquered by Frederik Hendrik in 1632, after which the States General assumed the responsibilities of Brabant. Hendrik's court architect, Pieter Post, built a new Maastricht City Hall in a classicist style between 1659 and 1664, accommodating the unique political requirements with separate rooms for the different governing bodies that were grouped around a central domed hall.

The prosperity of the Dutch Golden Age coincided with a period of large church building in the Netherlands by the Reformed Church, from the 1640s to the middle of the 1670s. The Calvinist government in Leiden built the Marekerk, a domed octagonal preaching church, in the 1640s. The octagonal plan was associated with the Dome of the Rock, thought to be Solomon's Temple. The Oostkerk in Middelburg was built from 1647 to 1667 with an octagonal dome and lantern. Begun in 1668, the Lutheran Ronde Lutherse Kerk was built in a classicist style but also was a continuation of the architectural style of the Marekerk and Oostkerk buildings. It was funded by wealthy members of the congregation as well as donations from Germany and Scandinavia, with the dome and lantern covered by copper donated by Charles XI of Sweden.

In the last quarter of the seventeenth century, domes were features of the gardens of distinguished Dutch country houses.

== Spanish Habsburgs ==
=== Crown of Castile ===
==== Viceroyalty of New Spain ====
The 1609 dome over the presbytery of the church of El Carmen in San Cristóbal de las Casas is in the boveda esquifada style of mudéjar art.

==== Kingdom of Galicia ====
The College of Nosa Señora da Antiga (1593–1616) was built a few years after El Escorial and influenced by it. The recorded plans for the dome differ from what was actually built by master mason Simón de Monasterio. Although the plans describe the use of iron chains and iron cramps, no evidence of their actual use has been identified. Its extradosed, hemispherical, single-shell dome spans 10 meters (33 ft) and is made entirely of granite. There are eight windows in the drum and eight pairs of ribs in the dome. On the exterior, the lower part of the drum is octagonal and the upper part is cylindrical. The lantern and cupola are topped by a pyramidal finial.

==== Kingdom of Castile ====
The inner brick shell of the dome of San Juan de la Penitencia in Alcalá de Henares (Madrid) collapsed in 1999 after the collapse of the outer wooden roof.

The tower over the bridge of Pinos-Puenta was rebuilt in the 17th century with a shallow crossed-arch dome.

In Spain, oval churches of the seventeenth century include the Convent of Las Bernardas in Alcalá de Henares, begun in 1617, and the Oratory of San Filippo Neri in Cádiz at the end of the century. Architect Pedro Sánchez built oval domes over his churches of Saint Hermenegildo in 1616 and San Antonio de los Alemanes in 1624.

The dome of the Church of las Calatravas (1670–1678) in Madrid was built by Lorenzo de San Nicolás.

In Spain, false vaults made of wood or reed and covered with plaster were used in the seventeenth century. The technique, dating from the medieval period, was applied to chapel domes to give the appearance of stone construction. The dome of Seville's Church of Santa María de las Nieves (begun 1659) used stucco to create high-relief scrolling foliage patterns like those of Islamic arabesque ornament.

==== Viceroyalty of Peru ====
In Lima, the "City of Kings", capital of Spain's Viceroyalty of Peru, frequent earthquakes prompted the use of quincha construction for the vaulting of the church of San Francisco (1657–1674) by Constantino de Vasconcelos and Manuel de Escobar. Quincha was an adaptation of an indigenous wattle and daub technique and consisted of a wooden structural framework filled out with cane or bamboo and covered with plaster and stucco to resemble stone. The anti-seismic properties of this light and elastic system allowed the 36.9-foot-wide (11.2 m) double-shell dome of the church, a hemisphere and lantern resting directly on pendentives, to survive for more than three hundred years and it became universally adopted along the Peruvian coast. Another 17th century example is the dome of the church of Santo Domingo in Lima (1678–1681).

The first dome built in Quito was the high dome over the crossing of the Church of Our Lady of Guápulo (1650–1684), a pilgrimage church made popular by a statue of the Virgin Mary that has miracles attributed to it. The statue, made to imitate that of Our Lady of Guadalupe in Extremadura, was destroyed in a fire in the 1830s.

=== Crown of Aragon ===
==== Kingdom of Naples ====
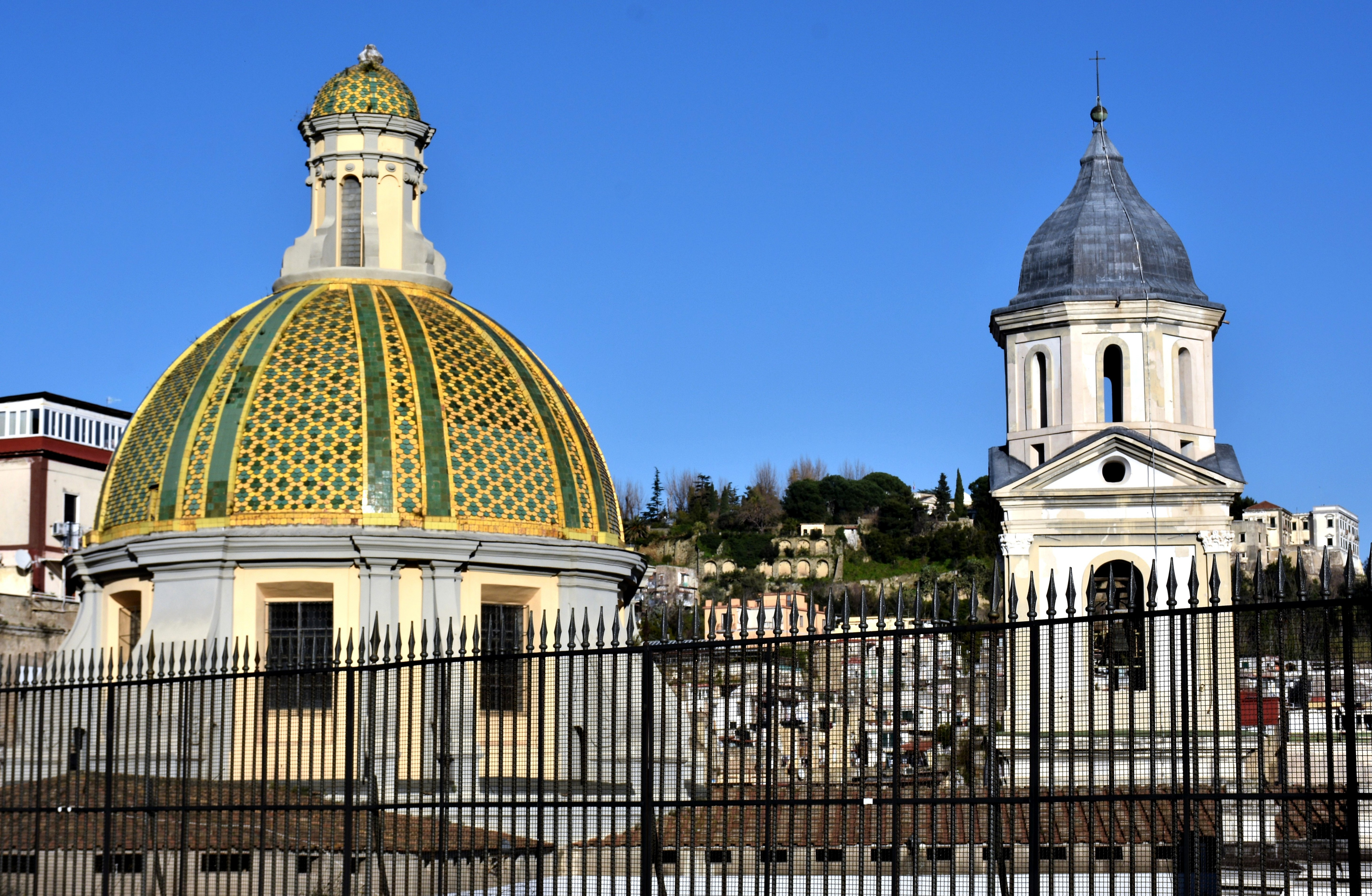
Santa Maria della Sanità

Earthquakes in Naples in 1627, 1688, and 1694 spurred the addition of domes to many churches as part of repairs and restorations in the 17th century. A 1999 survey identified 121 domes in the city, 42 of which were built in the Baroque era. Most are single shell extradosed domes on a circular plan. The domes were built of tuff ashlar voussoirs with mortared joints, Vesuvian stone fitted without mortar, or ribbed concrete domes. It was customary in the 17th and 18th centuries to cover the domes with polychrome majolica tilework influenced by Arabic art, such as on the dome of Santa Maria della Sanità, or with a copper and lead coating as on the dome of the Church of the Girolamini.

The two-shell dome of the Royal Chapel of the Treasure of St. Januarius (1608–1618) in Naples was built with a stone lantern that was replaced after an earthquake in 1688. Iron chains were incorporated into the structure, with the first placed during construction in 1612. Two more chains were added after earthquakes in 1626 and 1627. Further cracking spurred the removal in 1724 of the internal masonry lantern connecting the inner and outer domes, in order to lighten the structure, and the addition of a wooden and iron truss structure between the shells. The oculus in the inner dome was closed and a lighter wooden structure replaced the exterior lantern between 1724 and 1726.

The dome of Annunziata Church in Capua may have benefited from skills learned in the building of the dome of St. Peter's Basilica.

Giuseppe Nuvolo built the church of San Carlo all'Arena around 1626 in Naples, the first of several oval plan churches that would be built there until the middle of the eighteenth century.

==== Kingdom of Sardinia ====
In Sardinia, the Church of San Michele in Alghero was built from the second decade to the second half of the 17th century and includes a dome on an octagonal drum. The choir of Oristano Cathedral was covered by a ribbed dome on ribbed trumpet arches (1622).

==== Kingdom of Valencia ====
The Basilica de la Virgen de los Desamparados (1652–1667) in Valencia featured a simple oval pointed dome over its trapezoidal space when first built, spanning a space 19 meters by 15 meters. A thin inner dome was added around 1700 as a surface for a fresco, a practice not uncommon in 16th and 17th century Spain. Using a technique dating back to at least the 12th century, the inner dome was made with tile laid flat in two layers totaling just 80 millimeters. The upper half of this inner dome was supported during construction with 126 wrought iron t-shaped bars connecting the inner and outer domes, but upon completion of the inner dome, the iron bars were made structurally redundant.

==== Kingdom of Sicily ====
A lightweight dome made with a wooden frame, woven reeds, and plastered with a gypsum mortar was built over Messina Cathedral in Sicily in 1682. Known to react better than masonry vaulting to earthquakes, this technique was also more expensive due to the need for specialized artisans and the use of white poplar wood in the structure, which unlike traditional wooden formwork could not be re-used and was rare on the island. It was used in eastern Sicily after earthquakes struck in 1693 and 1727.

The church of Santissimo Salvatore in Palermo was built from 1682 with an elliptical dome over a dodecagon plan. It had a long span of 24 meters (79 ft) and was built with 29 rows of freestone. It was damaged in World War II and rebuilt with rings of reinforced concrete over rows of dressed stone.

=== Duchy of Milan ===
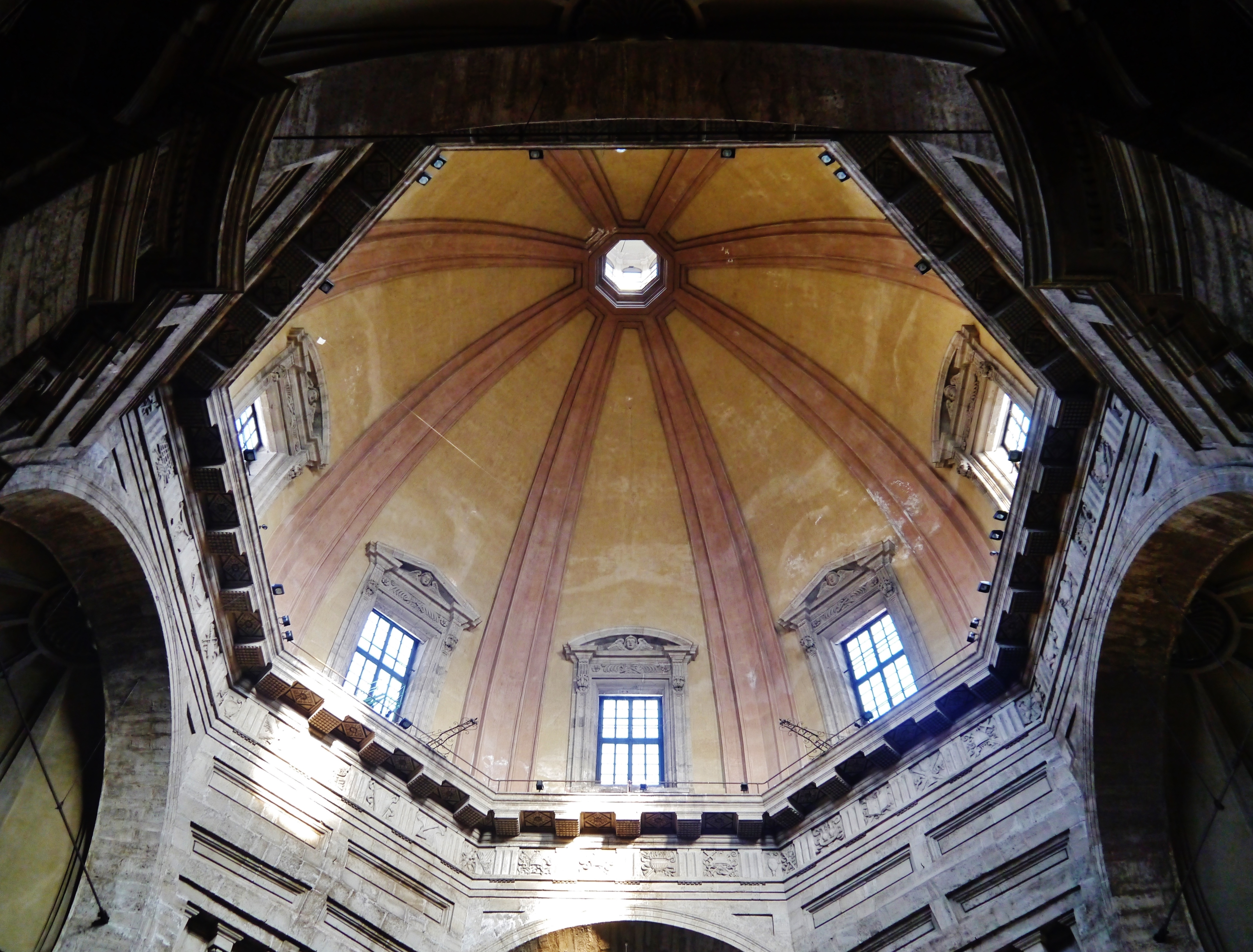
The Basilica of San Lorenzo in Milan

In Milan, proposals for the dome of San Lorenzo (built in 1619) included versions both with and without timburios, although, along with the quincunx plan Church of Sant'Alessandro, the building had the more difficult supporting structure of four main arches between four free-standing pillars. A dome for Sant'Alessandro was built in 1626 and demolished in 1627, perhaps due to the use of an inadequate number of iron ties. Although the dome had a timburio, it may also have had a lower and less stable hemispherical form. Autographed drawings from the period indicate it was a ribbed hemispherical dome with a lantern and timburio. Deep cracks in the arches supporting the dome caused the completed dome to be demolished, along with the supporting arches in February 1627. In 1629, the supporting piers were enlarged and the four round arches were strengthened with iron reinforcement and by adding pointed arches above them. An outbreak of disease stopped work in 1630 and the dome was not completed until 1693, with an extrados shape.

=== Burgundian Circle ===
Saint Peter's Abbey in Ghent was rebuilt in 1629, having been destroyed in the Protestant uprising that began in the Netherlands in 1568, a part of the Eighty Years' War. The church was rebuilt in an Italian Baroque style with one of the first church domes in the Southern Netherlands, just after the completion of the domed Basilica of Our Lady of Scherpenheuvel, and seems to have been intended to convey a counter-reformation message.

=== Kingdom of Portugal ===
The New Cathedral of Coimbra (begun in 1598) used the same half-tiburium buttressing for its dome as had earlier Spanish churches in Seville and Sassari.

== Austrian Habsburgs and the Holy Roman Empire ==
German and Austrian influence resulted in many bulbous cupolas in Poland and Eastern Europe in the Baroque period, and rural church towers in the Austrian and Bavarian Alps still feature them. Onion-shaped spires can be found in rural and pilgrimage churches in southern Germany, northeastern Italy, the former Czechoslovakia, Austria, and some of Poland, Hungary, and the former Yugoslavia.

=== Grand Duchy of Tuscany ===
The church of Santa Maria Nuova in Cortona, Tuscany, was built with a low parallelepiped, drum, and dome at its crossing, in keeping with Bramante's recommendations in his Opinio.

=== Duchy of Parma ===
The church of Santa Maria del Quartiere in Parma, Italy, was built with a hexagonal dome. The dome has been strengthened with a system of encircling tie rods.

=== Free imperial cities ===
The Augsburg Town Hall (1615–1620), designed by Lutheran architect Elias Holl, included two towers topped by onion domes and these became part of the city's civic identity by the later seventeenth century. Like the town hall, the Lutheran churches of Holy Cross and St. Ulrich have onion domes. Domes like these gained in popularity in central and southern Germany and in Austria in the seventeenth and eighteenth centuries, particularly in the Baroque style.

=== Electorate of Bavaria ===
Onion spires are predominant in Bavarian country churches, such as those on the three towers of the 1688 "Kappel" pilgimage church near Waldsassen by Abraham Leuthner and Georg Dientzenhofer, who had both worked in Prague. Onion domes over the Bavarian pilgrimage churches of Maria Birnbaum (1661–1682) and Westerndorf (1670) may also indicate influence from Prague through models in architectural design books, such as one by Abraham Leuthner. In other examples, such as the onion dome on the tower of St. Ulrich's and St. Afra's Abbey (1602), the influences are less clear.

Johann Jakob Herkomer's training in Venice appears to have influenced his thin timber dome over the Chapel of Our Lady of Seven Sorrows (1684–1692), his family chapel at Sameister.

=== Duchy of Savoy ===
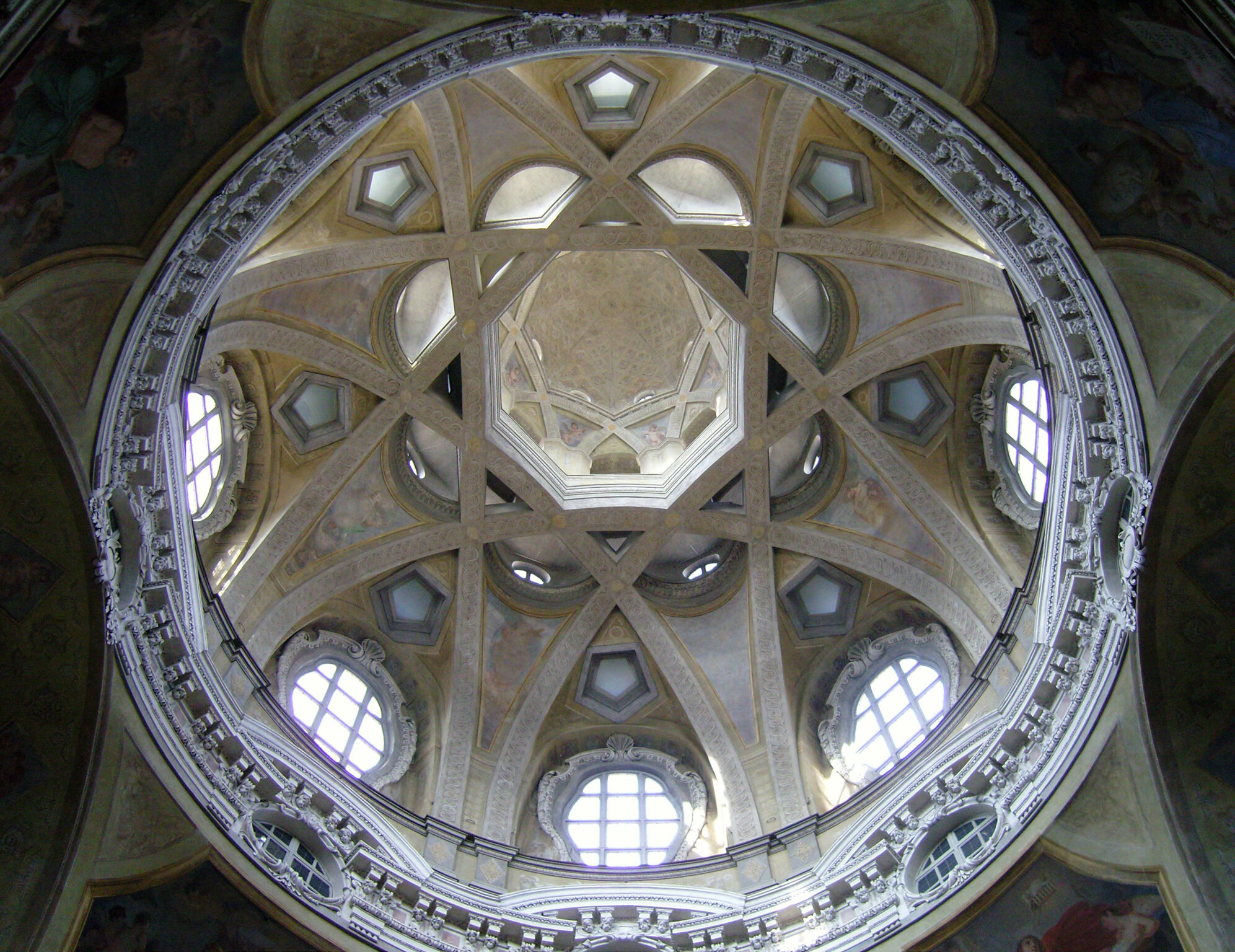
Church of San Lorenzo in Turin

In the Church of San Lorenzo (1670–1687) in Turin, Guarino Guarini, a Theatine monk and mathematician, used interlacing bands or ribs reminiscent of Islamic domes at Iznik or Cordoba, or the Christian example at Torres Del Río. The four years he spent in Paris may have influenced the emphasis on forced perspective and optical effects in his domes, in contrast to the more formalistic architectural design of Rome at that time. He used form, color, and light to give the illusion of greater height in his centralized domed churches. His dome over the Chapel of the Holy Shroud (1667–1690) in Turin is supported by six stacked hexagonal layers of six arches each, arranged such that each layer of arches spring from the peaks of the arches in the layer below them. Although the layers form a cone leading to the base of the dome, each is made progressively smaller to exaggerate the appearance of height. The dome itself is a lighter color than the lower levels of the church, also making it appear even farther away. The ribs in San Lorenzo and Il Sidone were shaped as catenary curves.

The idea of a large oculus in a solid dome revealing a second dome originated with Guarini. He established the oval dome as a reconciliation of the longitudinal plan church favored by the liturgy of the Counter-Reformation and the centralized plan favored by idealists. Guarini's drawings, including isometric intersections of spheres, barrel vaults, and oval domes as well as drawings explaining construction and ceiling patterns, were published posthumously in the Architettura Civile and influenced the designs of Hildebrandt, the Dientzenhofers, and Balthasar Neumann in Central Europe. With the newly developed mathematics of calculus, these experimental designs could be proven and would become the foundation of Rococo spatial arrangements.

== Papal States ==
The practice of including columns in the supports of a crossing dome did not begin in the city of Rome until the end of the sixteenth and beginning of the seventeenth centuries, influenced by Northern Italian churches. Examples in Rome include San Salvatore in Lauro and Santissima Trinità dei Pellegrini. The domed extension of the Cathedral in Monte Compatri uses the crossing support model of Santissima Trinità dei Pellegrini but extends the mirrors the column supports in a cruciform pattern.

The dome of the basilica at Montecassino, by architect Orazio Torriani, was structurally complete by the end of 1613. Surviving letters from Torriani document the materials needed for the construction, including four iron chains for the dome. The basilica was destroyed by bombardment in February 1944 but rebuilt after the war.

The dome by Carlo Maderno of San Giovanni dei Fiorentini was evidently an early inspiration in the planning of the dome of Sant'Andrea della Valle by Moderno and Borromini, but Sant'Andrea della Valle as built is said to be the first modeled on the dome of St. Peter's Basilica.

Oval plan churches spread outside of Rome following Vignola's innovation with the church of Santa Anna dei Palafrenieri. Giovan Battista Aleotti built both Santa Maria della Celletta in Argenta and San Carlo Borromeo in Ferrara between 1609 and 1621. The oval plans synthesize longitudinal and central plan church layouts, allowing clear views of the altar from all points.

Francesco Borromini's dome of San Carlo alle Quattro Fontane (1638–1641) has a novel oval plan that approximates an ellipse using four circular arcs based on the vertices of two large equilateral triangles; a complex geometrical coffer pattern of crosses, octagons, and lozenges is repeated eight times on the dome's inner surface. The long axis of the dome is 51 palms (11.37 meters), the short axis is 36 palms (8.02 meters), and the height is 23 palms (5.13 meters). Because the dome uses a pattern of coffers that get smaller as they approach the oculus and because it is lit from both above and below, the dome appears lighter and higher than it would otherwise. The church inaugurated the high baroque style in Rome. A copy based on plans provided by Borromini was built as the church of Madonna del Prato in Gubbio.

Borromini's masterpiece is the dome of Sant'Ivo alla Sapienza (1642–1650), built for Pope Urban VIII at a university in Rome. The ribbed dome has a unique and complex geometry with a large window in each of it six lobes and stucco ornamentation. Early drawings indicate that the windows in the dome were to be hexagons, matching the overall hexagonal groundplan of the church and in apparent reference to the honeycomb pattern of bees, which were a symbol of the patron's Barberini family. The spiral shape of the lantern spire has a single bejeweled band that makes three complete turns, which may have been a reference to the triple crown of the papacy and the three-in-one nature of the Trinity but was intended to practically serve as an access walkway to the top of the spire.

The style of using ribs in a dome over a coffered background was first expressed over the small chapel of Filippo Neri in the church of Santa Maria in Vallicella (1647–1651), modified by Pietro da Cortona to have small oval windows at its base. Cortona also revised the dome of Santa Maria della Pace (1656–1659) to have a stepped feature on the exterior, evocative of the Pantheon, and stucco ribs over octagonal coffers on the dome's interior. The domes of Santi Luca e Martina (begun 1634) and San Carlo al Corso (1668), both about 14 meters wide with an oval vertical profile, were entirely designed by Cortona.

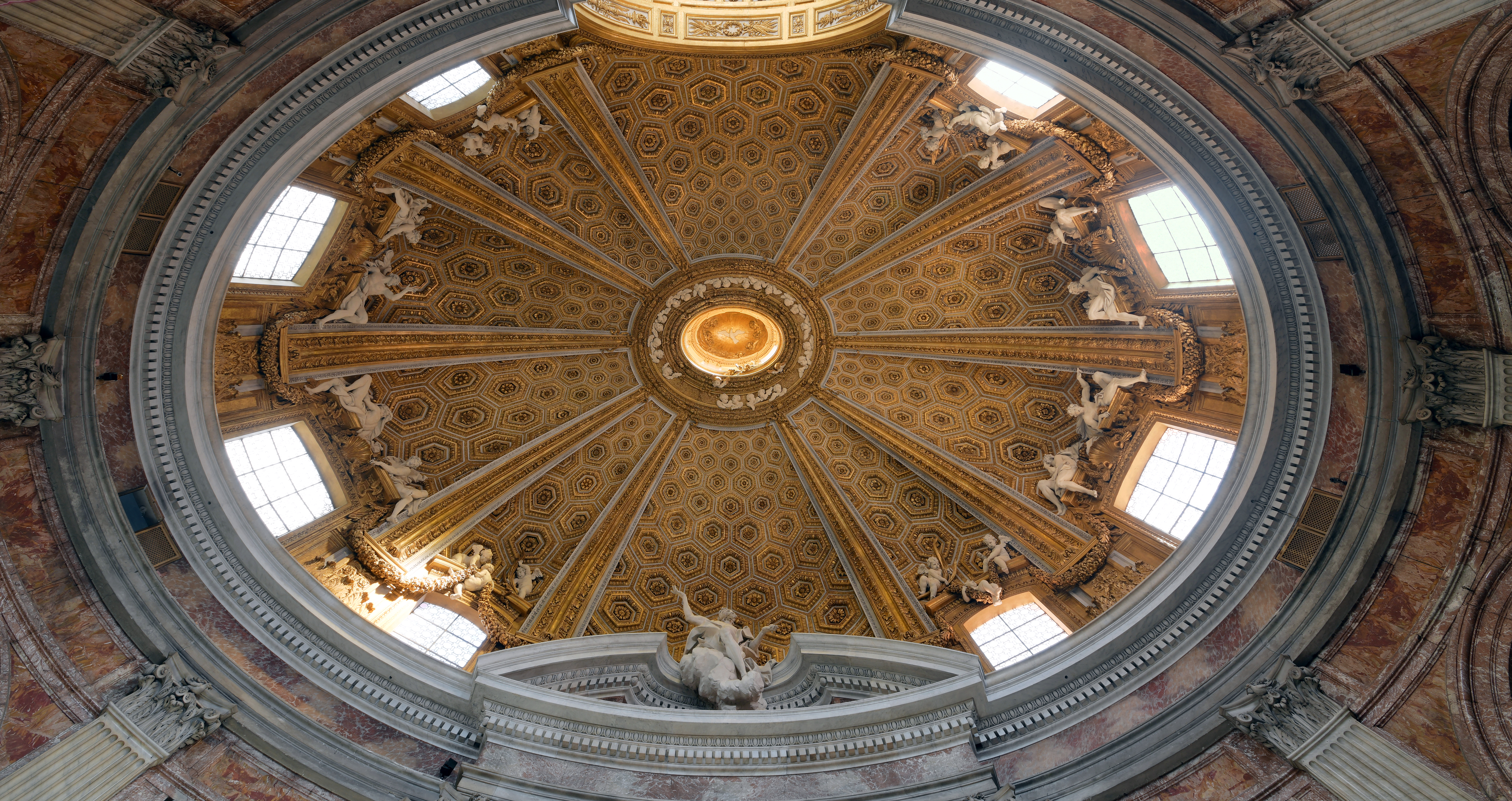
Sant'Andrea al Quirinale in Rome

The oval plan church of Sant'Andrea al Quirinale (1658–1661) by Bernini is unusual in that the entrance is on the minor axis and it is often depicted as unique in this respect, but the later churches of Santi Celso e Giuliano (1735) and Santissimo Nome di Maria (1736) also have this layout. Bernini's Sant'Andrea al Quirinale is known as the oval Pantheon.

The visual framing between the facade towers of the dome over the church of Sant'Agnese in Agone and its closeness to the front of the church may have been intended as a criticism of the arrangement of the dome of St. Peter's Basilica relative to its facade. The original design by Carlo Rainaldi had a dome without a drum, but this was revised by Borromini.

Work on the Cathedral of Santa Margherita in Montefiascone, halted at the level of the drum due to lack of funds, was resumed after a 1670 fire destroyed the temporary wooden roof and damaged the interior. The stone dome was built by Carlo Fontana with eight ribs connected to each other by horizontal arches to resist outward force. It was completed in 1673 and he defended its proportions in print by both citing the measured proportions of other domes as well as the existing geometrical rules of proportion based on materials and supports. The dome was made of light tufa stone, 112.5 palmi in size, with a thickness around 2.5 palmi. The thickness of the dome does not decrease as it gets higher. Iron chains to resist lateral movement would be added later.

Santa Maria in Campitelli (1662–1675) was originally designed with a large oval domed nave, in addition to a smaller circular dome over the sanctuary, but this was abandoned in favor of just a dome over the sanctuary, possibly due to cost concerns.

Galeazzo Alessi's plans for the dome of the Basilica of Saint Mary of the Angels in Assisi (1678) were executed to create a dome on a tall drum, with the drum height being almost twice the amount later recommended by Carlo Fontana in his 1694 book "Il Tempio Vaticano e sua origine" (The Vatican Temple and Its Origins). The dome was built over the transept of the church's Latin cross plan, directly above the Portiuncula, a small church building saved by Francis of Assisi. The diameter is about 20 meters (66 ft). Although circular on the inside, the dome is octagonal in plan on the exterior. It was strengthened by three metal rings after the earthquake of 1832.

The two domed churches of Santa Maria dei Miracoli and Santa Maria in Montesanto were built in the Piazza del Popolo, an entrance to the city of Rome, beginning in 1662 under Carlo Rainaldi and finishing under Bernini from 1671. The two were designed to be symmetrical with each other, initially as two Greek cross plan churches with identical domes, but ultimately Santa Maria in Montesanto, the building on the left, was built with an oval plan dome behind a decagonal drum, and the building on the right, Santa Maria dei Miracoli, was built with a circular plan dome behind an octagonal drum. The differences may be due to the narrower wedge-shaped plot of land for Santa Maria in Montesanto coupled with the desire for the domes to be as large as possible. An oval plan allowed the full width of the left dome to be set farther back from the facade, where there was more space, while still appearing to match the dimensions of the dome of the church on the right. The oval-domed Santa Maria in Montesanto was completed by 1675 but consecrated in 1678. The circular-domed Santa Maria dei Miracoli was consecrated in 1679.

The church of Sant'Ignazio (1685) in Rome has an illusionistic painting of a dome by Andrea Pozzo on the flat ceiling of the crossing where a real dome would have been, with the proper point to see the painting in the correct perspective marked in the floor by a yellow marble circle.

== Polish–Lithuanian Commonwealth ==
Polish examples of churches with domed transepts include a collegiate church in the city of Żółkiew (1606–1618), a Franciscan church in Święta Anna near Przyrów (1609–1617), the burial place of Ligęza in Rzeszów (1624–1627), the burial place of Opaliński in Sieraków (1624–1629), and the burial place of Sapieha in Kodeń (founded in 1631). In Poland, polygonal buildings and earlier medieval towers were often capped with domes in the Renaissance or Baroque styles. The Renaissance domes were generally onion domes stacked on top of one another and separated with so-called lanterns of openwork arcades. An example is the tower at the Basilica of the Holy Trinity in Chełmża. The Baroque domes were characterized by unusual shapes and curves, such as those of Gniezno Cathedral. However, many bulbous domes in the larger cities of eastern Europe were replaced during the second half of the eighteenth century in favor of hemispherical or stilted cupolas in the French or Italian styles.

In the Polish–Lithuanian Commonwealth, Roman Catholic churches with Greek-cross plans and monumental domes designed by Tylman van Gameren became popular in the last quarter of the seventeenth century. Examples include St. Kazimierz Church (1689–1695) and the Church of St. Anthony of Padua, Czerniaków (1690–1692). The traditional Orthodox church design in three parts, with a dome over each, was used in hundreds of Orthodox and Uniate wooden churches in the seventeenth and eighteenth centuries. An example of a Polish Roman Catholic wooden dome is on the Church of SS. Margaret and Judith in Kraków (1680–1690).

Tatar wooden mosques in Poland were domed central plan structures with adjacent minarets. The Tatar mosques of the Grand Duchy of Lithuania used bulbous domes on their minarets, a style apparently influenced by Christian Slavic folk architecture.

== Republic of Venice ==
The church of San Pietro di Castello was completed in 1621 with a thin timber dome and lantern, built on a masonry drum.

Inspired by Palladio's churches, the two-domed church of Santa Maria della Salute by Baldassare Longhena was built on the edge of Venice's Grand Canal from 1631 to 1681 to celebrate the end of a plague in the city in 1630. The larger dome is 40 metres (130 ft) tall over an octagonal nave for public ceremonies and the smaller dome covers the choir used by the clergy for official celebrations. The larger dome has a span of 18 metres (60 ft) and the smaller dome has a span of 12 metres (40 ft). The architect attributed the shape of the domed church to a crown evoked by the dedication of the church to Mary, Queen of Heaven.

== Kingdom of France ==
In Paris, the dome of St. Marie de la Visitation was built by François Mansart from 1632 to 1633, who would later design the church of Val-de-Grâce (1645–1710), built to commemorate the birth of Louis XIV (although the dome of Val-de-Grâce was designed by Jacques Lemercier).

Oval domes can also be found in secular buildings such as the Château de Maisons (1642–1646) and the Château de Vaux-le-Vicomte (1657).

In the Parisian church of Sainte-Anne-la-Royale (1662), Guarino Guarini, a Theatine monk and mathematician, used interlacing bands or ribs reminiscent of Islamic domes at Iznik or Cordoba, or the Christian example at Torres Del Río.

== Portuguese Empire ==
The Church of Our Lady of Divine Providence in Goa

The Church of Our Lady of Divine Providence (1656–1661) was built in the Portuguese colonial capital of Goa, India by Italian Theatines Carlo Ferrarini and Francesco Maria Milazzo. It has a Greek cross plan with a central dome. Visibility of the dome from ground level was reduced by the addition of a towered facade from 1673 to 1675, but it remained prominent when viewed from a distance. The appearance and framing of the dome between its facade towers was imitated by the so-called "cupoliform churches", such as the Church of Saint Stephen on the island of Juá (1759), and possibly some 17th century domed Hindu temples, including Saptakoteshwar Temple, Shanta Durga Temple, Mangueshi Temple, and Nagueshi Temple.

== Kingdom of England ==
Rebuilding after the 1666 Great Fire of London included a few new churches with single-shell timber domes, covered on the outside with leadwork and on the inside with plaster. The light weight of these timber domes allowed for thin supporting columns that minimized obstructions to the liturgy for worshipers, as encouraged by the Church of England's emphasis on open plans for its reformed liturgical practice.

The dome at the church of St Mary-at-Hill was significantly redesigned by James Savage in 1827 as a hemispherical sail vault with a small lantern, but the original design by Christopher Wren was built from 1670 to 1674 as a 5.2-metre (17 ft) wide 16-sided lantern topped with a shallow dome. Beneath the lantern, the intersection of four shallow barrel vaults created small pendentives that supported a shallow plaster dome described at the time merely as a "coveing" under the cupola. The cupola itself was likely supported by cross braces under a normal pitched roof that covered everything up to the base of the lantern.

The church of St Benet Fink (1670–1675) was an elongated 10-sided building with six thin stone columns at its center supporting pendentives under a timber oval dome with a small 12-sided lantern. Although admired at the time as one of Wren's finest designs, it was demolished in the early 1840s.

The church of St Stephen Walbrook in London was built by Christopher Wren from 1672 to 1677 and its dome has been called "the first classical dome in England". Although the dome of St Benet Fink was likely earlier, the dome of St Stephen Walbrook was more ambitious. The timber hemispherical dome spanned more than 13 metres (43 ft) over pendentives and squinches and has been described as "the largest structure of its kind in Europe". It was capped with a cupola and decorated on the interior with plasterwork coffers. It was reconstructed between 1948 and 1952 after being damaged in World War II.

All Saints' Church, Northampton, was rebuilt from 1675 to 1680 after the 1675 Great Fire of Northampton with a thin timber dome similar in scale to the lantern of St Mary-at-Hill. Although not designed by Christopher Wren, it appears to have been influenced by his designs.

== See also ==
- Early and simple domes
- History of modern period domes

== Bibliography ==
- Bagliani, Stefano (May 2009). "The Architecture and Mechanics of Elliptical Domes" (PDF). Proceedings of the Third International Congress on Construction History, Cottbus. Archived from the original (PDF) on 2013-10-16.
- Bellini, Federico (2017). "8 Vaults and Domes: Statics as an Art". In Mallgrave, Harry Francis; Payne, Alina (eds.). Companion to the History of Architecture, Volume I, Renaissance and Baroque Architecture. John Wiley & Sons, Ltd. pp. 1–33. doi:10.1002/9781118887226.wbcha009. ISBN 978-1-118-88722-6.
- Born, Wolfgang (April 1944). "The Introduction of the Bulbous Dome into Gothic Architecture and its Subsequent Development". Speculum. 19 (2): 208–221. doi:10.2307/2849071. JSTOR 2849071. S2CID 162699497.
- Cabezas, Lino (2011). "Ornamentation and Structure in the Representation of Renaissance Architecture in Spain" (PDF). Nexus Network Journal. 13 (2): 257–279. doi:10.1007/s00004-011-0067-3. S2CID 123519607.
- Camilloni, Humberto Rodríguez (January 2003). Huerta, S. (ed.). "Quincha architecture: The development of an antiseismic structural system in seventeenth century Lima" (PDF). Proceedings of the First International Congress on Construction History, Madrid, 20th-24th January 2003. Madrid: I. Juan de Herrera, SEdHC, ETSAM, A. E. Benvenuto, COAM, F. Dragados: 1741–1752.
- Canciani, Marco; Falcolini, Corrado; Spadafora, Giovanna (2012). "From complexity of architecture to geometrical rule. The case study of the dome of San Carlino alle Quattro Fontane in Rome". X Forum internazionale di studi. Le vie dei Mercanti.
- Castex, Jean (2008). Architecture of Italy. Reference Guides to National Architecture. Westport, CT: Greenwood Press. ISBN 978-0-313-32086-6.
- Cavalagli, Nicola; Gusella, Vittorio (November 2014). "Structural Investigation of 18th-Century Ogival Masonry Domes: From Carlo Fontana to Bernardo Vittone". International Journal of Architectural Heritage. 9 (3): 265–276. doi:10.1080/15583058.2013.771294. S2CID 110969076.
- Cavalagli, Nicola; Gusella, Vittorio (February 2015). "Dome of the Basilica of Santa Maria Degli Angeli in Assisi: static and dynamic assessment". International Journal of Architectural Heritage. 9 (2): 157–175. doi:10.1080/15583058.2014.951799.
- Cennamo, Claudia; Cusano, Concetta (2020). "The "Baroque skyline" in Naples. Structural studies on 16th and 17th century domes in terms of form and stability". Architecture and Engineering. 5 (2): 8–16. doi:10.23968/2500-0055-2020-5-2-08-16. S2CID 225716551.
- Chervonnaya, Svetlana Mikhailovna (2014). "The Architecture of the Wooden Mosques of Lithuanian Tatars" (PDF). Tatarica (2). Kazan (Volga Region) Federal University: 179–194.
- Coisson, Eva; Ottoni, Federica (2015). "Structural monitoring of historical structures: increasing knowledge to minimize interventions". In Toniolo, Lucia; Boriani, Maurizio; Guidi, Gabriele (eds.). Built Heritage: Monitoring Conservation Management. Research for Development. Springer. pp. 83–92. doi:10.1007/978-3-319-08533-3_7. ISBN 978-3-319-08532-6.
- Cottone, Antonio; Bertorotta, Simona (2009), "New Domes for Old Churches (Palermo 1943)", Proceedings of the Third International Congress on Construction History, vol. 1, Cottbus, Germany: NEUNPLUS1
- Duvernoy, Sylvie (2015), "Baroque Oval Churches: Innovative Geometrical Patterns in Early Modern Sacred Architecture", Nexus Network Journal, 17 (2): 425–456, doi:10.1007/s00004-015-0252-x
- Earls, Michael W. (1971). "The Development of Structural Form in Franconian Rococo". In Malo, Paul (ed.). Essays to D. Kenneth Sargent. Syracuse, New York: The School of Architecture, Syracuse University. pp. 127–139.
- Escrig, F.; Cobreros, A.; Valcarcel, J.P. (1997), "The elliptical dome: a survey of constructive technique to stabilize a sophisticated structure", Structural studies, repairs and maintenance of historical buildings (STREMAH): proceedings of the 5th conference, San Sebastian, Spain, 1997, Advances in architecture series: Vol. 3, Computational Mechanics Publications
- Fusco, Annarosa Cerutti; Villanni, Marcello (2003). "Pietro da Cortona's Domes between New Experimentations and Construction Knowledge". In Huerta, S. (ed.). Proceedings of the First International Congress on Construction History, Madrid, 20th-24th January 2003 (PDF). Madrid: I. Juan de Herrera. pp. 579–591. ISBN 978-84-9728-070-9.
- Gallozzi, Arturo (2012), "Construction notes on the lost dome of Montecassino basilica", in Tampone, Gennaro; Corazzi, Roberto; Mandelli, Emma (eds.), Proceedings of the International Congress. DOMES IN THE WORLD. Florence, 19th – 23rd March, 2012, Florence: Nardini Editore, ISBN 978-8-840-44211-2
- Garofalo, Emanuela (2015). "New Architectural Models and Building Tradition: A Dialogue in Early Modern Sardinia – The Jesuit Church in Sassari". International Journal of Architectural Heritage. 9 (2). Taylor & Francis: 143–156. doi:10.1080/15583058.2014.951798.
- Garvan, Anthony (1950). "The Protestant Plain Style before 1630". Journal of the Society of Architectural Historians. 9 (3). University of California Press: 4–13. doi:10.2307/987455. JSTOR 987455.
- Giustina, Irene (2003), "On the art and the culture of domes. Construction in Milan and Lombardy in the late sixteenth and in the first half of the seventeenth century" (PDF), Proceedings of the First International Congress on Construction History, Madrid, Spain: Sociedad Española de Historia de la Construcción, pp. 1033–1042
- Giustina, Irene; Tomasoni, Elide; Giuriani, Ezio (2006), "The Early Dome of Sant'Alessandro in Milan (1627): a First Study of the Behaviour of the Structural Core with a Dome Resting on Four Free-Standing Pillars" ( (PDF)), Second International Congress on Construction History, Queens' College, University of Cambridge 29th March / 2nd April 2006, Construction History Society, pp. 1271–1292, ISBN 978-0-701-70204-5, archived from the original on 2022-12-07
- Guerra, Rosa Ana (2009), "The dome of the Colegio del Cardenal in Monforte de Lemos (Spain): geometry, construction and stability", in Kurrer, Karl-Eugen; Lorenz, Werner; Wetzk, Volker (eds.), Proceedings of the Third International Congress on Construction History, NEUNPLUS1, ISBN 978-3-936033-31-1
- Gusella, Vittorio; Belardi, Paolo; Bianconi, Fabio; Armeni, Marco; Cavalagli, Nicola; Martini, Luca (2012). "The domed skyscraper of Galeazzo Alessi. The geometric and structural ambiguities of dome of the Saint Mary of the Angels Basilica". Proceedings of the International Conference Domes in the World. Cultural Identity and Symbolism. Geometric and Formal Genesis. Construction, Identification, Conservation. Florence, Italy: Nardini Editore.
- Hanser, David A. (2006). Architecture of France. Greenwood Press. ISBN 978-0-313-31902-0.
- Heyman, Jacques (January 1998). "Hooke's Cubico-Parabolical Conoid". Notes and Records of the Royal Society of London. 52 (1). Royal Society: 39–50. doi:10.1098/rsnr.1998.0033. JSTOR 532075.
- Huemer, Frances (2001). "Borromini and Michaelangelo, III: The Dome of Sant' Andrea Della Valle". Notes in the History of Art. 20 (4). The University of Chicago Press: 23–29. doi:10.1086/sou.20.4.23206733. JSTOR 23206733.
- Huerta, Santigo (2012). "Structural Analysis of Thin Tile Vaults and Domes: The Inner Oval Dome of the Basilica de los Desamparados in Valencia" (PDF). In Carvais, Robert; Guillerme, André; Nègre, Valérie; Sakarovitch, Joël (eds.). Nuts and Bolts of Construction History. Culture, Technology and Society. Picard. pp. 375–383. ISBN 978-2-7084-0929-3.
- Jeffery, R. Brooks (2003). "From Azulejos to Zaguanes: The Islamic Legacy in the Built Environment of Hispano-America". Journal of the Southwest. 45 (1). Southwest Center, University of Arizona: 289–327. JSTOR 40170260.
- Krasny, Piotr (1999). "Architecture in Poland 1572-1764". In Ostrowski, Jan K. (ed.). Land of the Winged Horsemen: Art in Poland 1572-1764. New Haven, London: Art Services International. pp. 81–97. doi:10.11588/artdok.00002768.
- Kuiken, Kees (2013). "Van Haren's Church (1682-1686). Contested space and other paradigms for the construction of early modern nobility". Virtus. Journal of Nobility Studies. 20. Uitgeverij Verloren: 38–60.
- Kuiper, Yme (2019). "Country Houses and Estates in Dutch Urban and Rural History, 1600-1900". In Finch, Jonathan; Dyrmann, Kristine; Frausing, Mikael (eds.). Estate Landscapes in Northern Europe. Aarhus University Press. pp. 193–232. ISBN 978-8-771-84899-1.
- Kurzej, Michał (2015). "The Collegiate Church in Zamość in the Context of European Architecture". In Skowrońska, Renata; Flachenecker, Helmut (eds.). Leben zwischen und mit den Kulturen. Studien zu Recht, Bildung und Herrschaft in Mitteleuropa. Vol. 2. Toruń/Würzburg: Polska Misja Historyczna przy Uniwersytecie Juliusza Maksymiliana. pp. 169–186. ISBN 978-8-323-13491-6.
- Mainstone, Rowland (2003). "Saving the dome of St Peter's". Construction History. 19. The Construction History Society: 3–18. JSTOR 41613860.
- Manzanares, Gema López (January 2003), "The XVIIth century: Carlo Fontana's expertises" (PDF), Proceedings of the First International Congress on Construction History, Madrid, 20th-24th January 2003, Madrid, Spain: Sociedad Española de Historia de la Construcción, pp. 1307–1320
- Morel, Anne-Françoise; Germonprez, Dagmar (Winter 2012). "A Cornerstone in Architectural History: The Dedication of St. Peter's Abbey Church, Ghent, 1629". Notes in the History of Art. 31 (2). The University of Chicago Press on behalf of the Bard Graduate Center: 15–21. doi:10.1086/sou.31.2.23208931. JSTOR 23208931. S2CID 194035667.
- Nobile, Marco Rosario; Bares, Maria Mercedes (2015). "The use of 'false vaults' in 18th century buildings of Sicily". Construction History. 30 (1). The Construction History Society: 53–70. JSTOR 44215897.
- Nobile, Marco Rosario (2016). Architettura e costruzione in Italia Meridionale (XVI-XVII sec.) [Architecture and Construction in Southern Italy (16th-17th Century)] (PDF). Tracciati. Storia e costruzione nel Mediterraneo (in Italian). Palermo: Edizioni Caracol s.n.c. ISBN 978-88-98546-64-0.
- Nuttgens, Patrick (1997). The Story of Architecture. Hong Kong: Phaidon Press Limited. ISBN 978-0-7148-3616-4.
- Pajovic, Luka (2024). Holzer, Stefan; Langenberg, Silke; Knobling, Clemens; Kasap, Orkun (eds.). "Thin Timber Domes in Restoration England (c. 1670–1680)". Construction Matters: Proceedings of the 8th international congress on construction history - Zürich. vdf Hochschulverlag AG: 730–737. doi:10.3218/4166-8. hdl:11268/13058. ISBN 978-3-7281-4166-8.
- Prak, Maarten (2023). The Dutch Republic in the Seventeenth Century. Translated by Webb, Diane. Cambridge University Press. p. 340. ISBN 978-1-009-24059-8.
- Robison, Elwin C. (December 1991). "Optics and Mathematics in the Domed Churches of Guarino Guarini". Journal of the Society of Architectural Historians. 50 (4): 384–401. doi:10.2307/990663. JSTOR 990663.
- Russo, Valentina; Lignola, G. P.; Cosenza, Edoardo; Tucci, Grazia (2006), "Static history and structural assessment of masonry domes. The Treasure of St. Gennaro's Chapel in Naples", Proceedings of the 5th International Conference on "Structural Analysis of Historical Constructions-Possibilities of numerical and experimental techniques", New Delhi, MacMillan India Ltd., hdl:11588/118923, ISBN 9781403931573
- Russo, Valentina (2020). "Construction history and digital heritage. Experimentations on renaissance domes in Campania (Italy)" (PDF). The International Archives of the Photogrammetry, Remote Sensing and Spatial Information Sciences. XLIV-M-1-2020. HERITAGE2020 (3DPast ǀ RISK-Terra) International Conference, 9–12 September 2020, Valencia, Spain: 295–302. Bibcode:2020ISPAr44M1..295R. doi:10.5194/isprs-archives-XLIV-M-1-2020-295-2020. Archived from the original on 2020-07-25.
- Sakkal, Mamoun (1995). "Geometry of ribbed domes in Spain and North Africa". Journal for the History of Arabic Science. 11 (1&2). Institute for the History of Arabic Science, University of Aleppo: 53–73.
- Santos, Joaquim Rodrigues dos (2021). "From Rome to Goa: Domes in Goan Catholic Architecture" (PDF). Identidades y Redes Culturales: V Congreso Internacional de Barroco Iberoamericano. Granada: Editorial Universidad de Granada: 1035–1043.
- Schindler, Hans (May 1981). "Concerning the Origin of the Onion Dome and Onion Spires in Central European Architecture". Journal of the Society of Architectural Historians. 40 (2): 138–142. doi:10.2307/989727. JSTOR 989727.
- Schlimme, Hermann (May 2009), "Santa Margherita at Montefiascone and Carlo Fontana's Knowledge on Dome Construction", in Kurrer, Karl-Eugen; Lorenz, Werner; Wetzk, Volker (eds.), Proceedings of the Third International Congress on Construction History, Cottbus, May 2009, Cottbus, Germany: Brandenburg University of Technology, pp. 1317–1324, ISBN 978-3-936033-31-1
- Scott, John Beldon (December 1982). "S. Ivo alla Sapienza and Borromini's Symbolic Language". Journal of the Society of Architectural Historians. 41 (4). University of California Press on behalf of the Society of Architectural Historians: 294–317. doi:10.2307/989801. JSTOR 989801.
- Shearman, John (1992), "IV Domes", Only Connect: Art and the Spectator in the Italian Renaissance, vol. 5579, Princeton University Press, pp. 149–191, doi:10.2307/j.ctvhhhdpb.9
- Simona, Michea (2005). "Ovals in Borromini's Geometry". In Emmer, Michele (ed.). Mathematics and Culture II. Visual Perfection: Mathematics and Creativity. Germany: Springer-Verlag Berlin Heidelberg. pp. 45–52. ISBN 3-540-21368-6.
- Spicer, Andrew (2016). Lutheran Churches in Early Modern Europe. Routledge. ISBN 978-1-351-92116-9.
- Stemp, Richard (2016). The Secret Language of Churches and Cathedrals: Decoding the Sacred Symbolism of Christianity's Holy Building (reprint ed.). London: Watkins Media Limited. p. 224. ISBN 978-1-780-28961-8.
- Stephenson, Davis; Hammond, Victoria; Davi, Keith F. (2005). Visions of Heaven: the Dome in European Architecture. Princeton Architectural Press. ISBN 978-1-56898-549-7.
- Suárez, Javier; Boothby, Thomas E.; González, José A. (2020). "Constructive and structural analysis of a Baroque dome in Spain. The encamonada dome". Journal of Cultural Heritage. 44. Elsevier: 229–238. doi:10.1016/j.culher.2019.12.005.
- van Benthem Jutting, W. S. S. (1968). "Ornamental shell festoons of the Oostkerk at Middelburg" (PDF). Beaufortia. 15 (181): 15–20.
- Webster, Susan Verdi (2006). "Confraternities as Patrons of Architecture in Colonial Quito, Ecuador". In Black, Christopher F.; Gravestock, Pamela (eds.). Early Modern Confraternities in Europe and the Americas: International and Interdisciplinary Perspectives. Ashgate Publishing, Ltd. ISBN 978-0-754-65174-1.
- Wittkower, Rudolf (June 1937). "Carlo Rainaldi and the Roman Architecture of the Full Baroque". The Art Bulletin. 19 (2). College Art Association: 242–313. doi:10.2307/3045682. JSTOR 3045682.
- Wittkower, Rudolf (1989), "S. Maria della Salute: Scenographic Architecture and the Venetian Baroque", in Kleinbauer, W. Eugène (ed.), Modern Perspectives in Western Art History: An Anthology of Twentieth-Century Writings on the Visual Arts (Medieval Academy Reprints for Teaching), vol. 25, University of Toronto Press, pp. 165–192, ISBN 978-0-8020-6708-1
- Wittkower, Rudolf; Connors, Joseph; Montagu, Jennifer (1999), Art and Architecture in Italy, 1600 to 1750. Vol. III. Late Baroque, Yale University Press, ISBN 978-0-300-07941-8
