= Church of Saint Anthony of the Germans =

Cultural property in Madrid, Spain

- Iglesia de San Antonio de los Alemanes (Spanish)
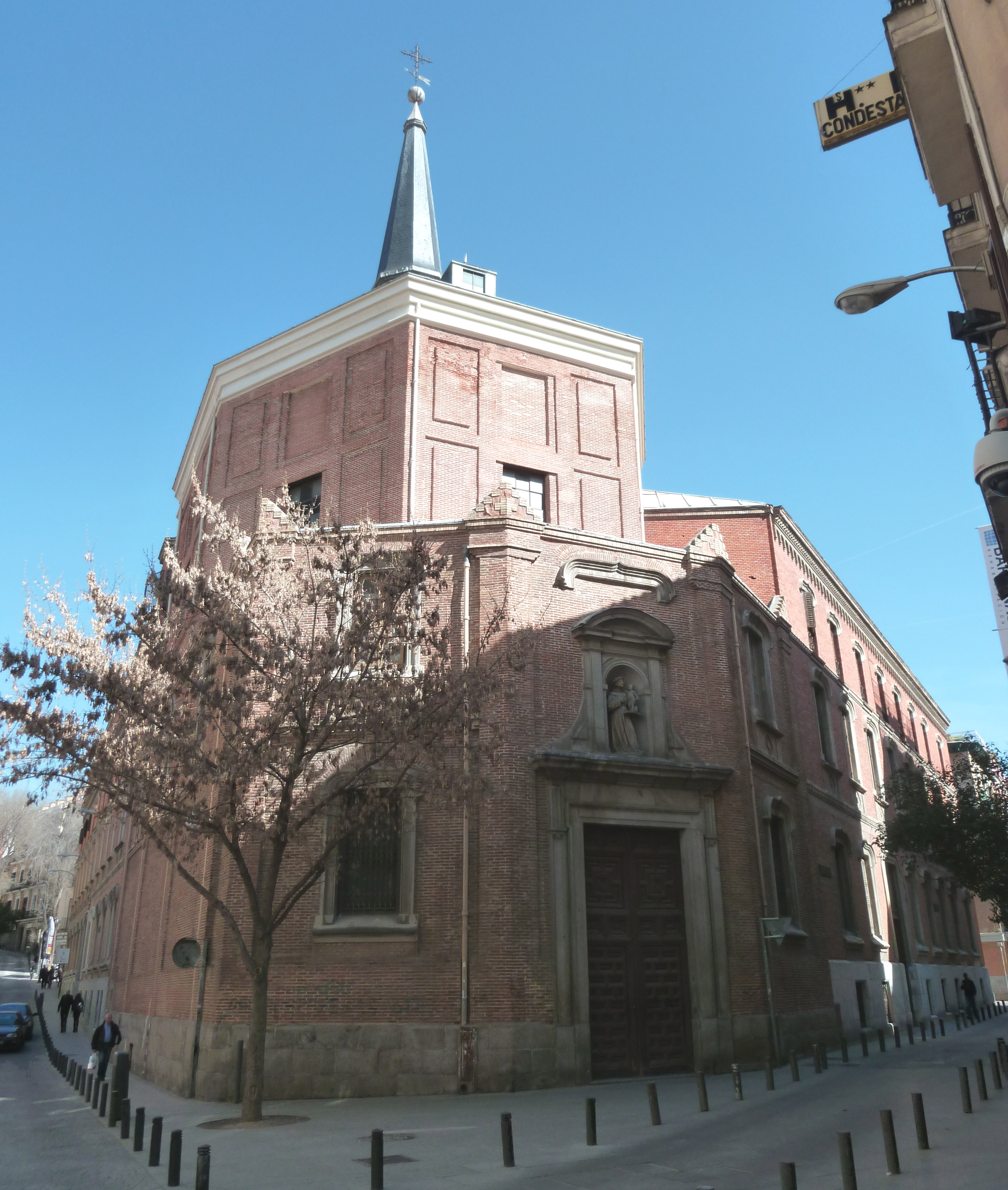

- Location within Spain
- 40.422365°N 3.703828°W
- Location: Madrid, Spain

Spanish Cultural Heritage
- Official name: Iglesia de San Antonio de los Alemanes
- Type: Non-movable
- Criteria: Monument
- Designated: 1973
- Reference no.: RI-51-0003915

Saint Anthony of the Germans (Spanish: San Antonio de los Alemanes) is a Baroque, Roman Catholic church located at the corner of Calle de la Puebla and Corredera Baja de San Pablo Madrid, Spain. It is noted for its baroque interior decoration. It was declared Bien de Interés Cultural in 1973.

== History ==
The 17th-century church is built in the Baroque style and was designed by Pedro Sánchez. The highly decorative High Altar and three side altars belong to the 18th century and were commissioned by the last Habsburg kings of Spain.

The church was built in the 1620s-1630s by King Felipe III along with a hostel and hospital for the Portuguese migrants who moved to Madrid when Portugal was under Spanish rule. For this reason it was originally called Hospital de los Portugueses. When Portugal gained independence, Phillip IV's Queen, Mariana de Austria, dedicated the refuge to German immigrants, and changed names.

King Phillip V gave the administration of the church over to the Hermandad del Refugio (Fraternity of Sanctuary), and this group continues to manage it today, offering food and shelter to the homeless of Madrid.

The Church is dedicated to St Antony of Padua, patron saint of the poor. St Antony was born in Lisbon, Portugal in 1198, and became a first an Augustinian, then a Franciscan order friar, well known for his eloquent sermons. He preached in France and Italy, and died in Padua in 1231 at the age of 36. St Antony is considered the patron saint of those with items lost or misplaced.

The church houses frescoes by Luca Giordano and Francisco Ricci. The prolific Neopolitan painter Giordano was court painter (1692-1702) to Charles II of Spain, and active for the Royal Palace of Aranjuez and the Buen Retiro Palace.

He was renowned for his speed of painting, and had been nicknamed "Luca-get-it-done-fast" (Luca fà-presto). On one occasion at the Spanish court, the Queen apparently asked him what his wife looked like, and he proceeded to include her image in the painting he had before him.

Francisco Ricci was the son of an Italian painter, and came to Madrid to work on the decorations at the Escorial Monastery under Federico Zuccaro.

This Baroque church is a short walk from the Gran Vía and the nearest Metro station at Callao.

== See also ==
- Catholic Church in Spain
- 17th-century Western domes
- List of oldest church buildings
