= St. Cajetan Church =

- Church of Divine Providence
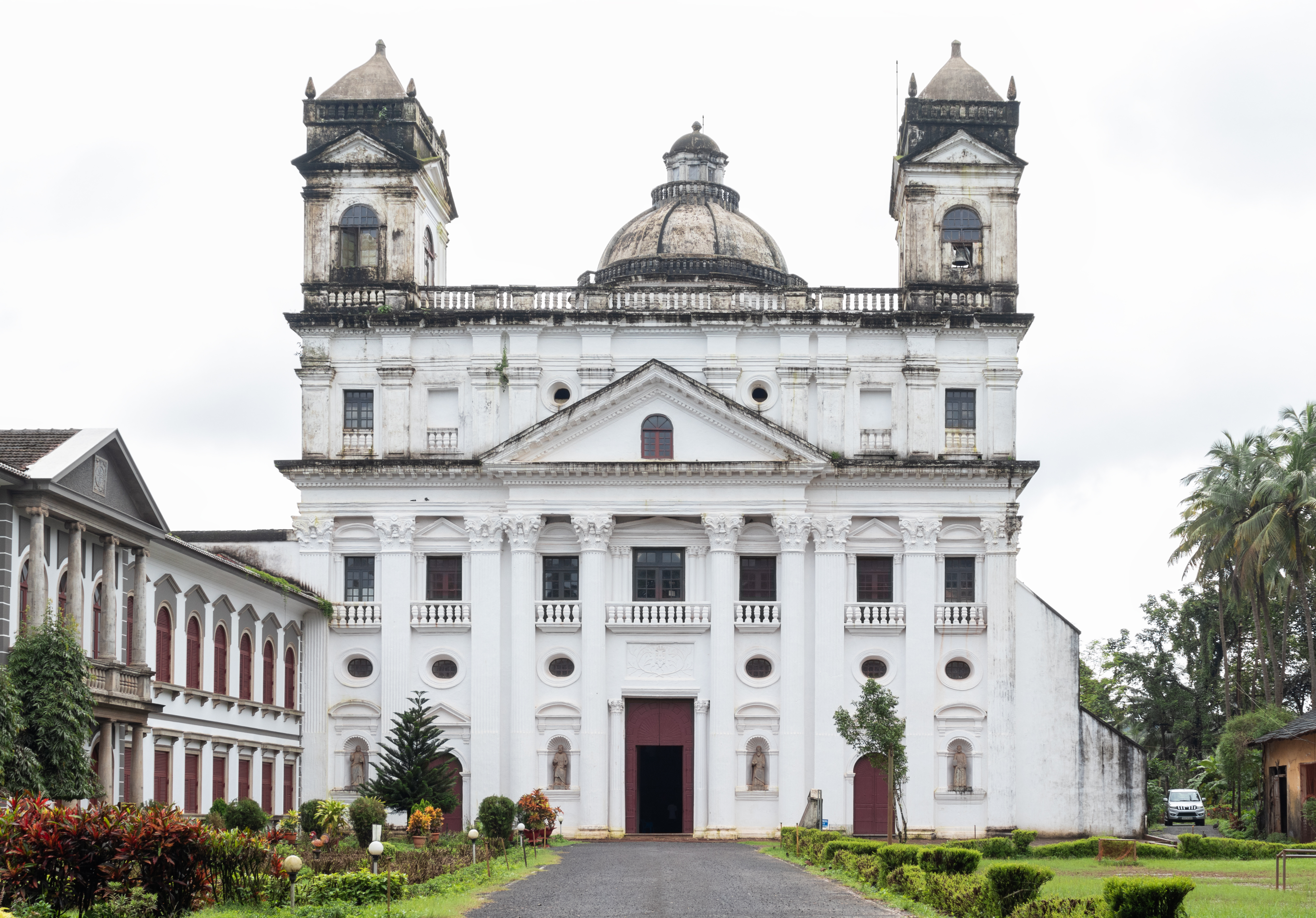
- St. Cajetan Church in Old Goa
- St. Cajetan Church
- 15°30′20.5″N 73°54′55.2″E
- Country: India
- Denomination: Roman Catholic

History
- Status: Church

Architecture
- Functional status: Active
- Style: Corinthian order
- Completed: 1661; 365 years ago

St. Cajetan Church, also known as the Church of Divine Providence, is a church of the Roman Catholic Archdiocese of Goa and Daman located in Old Goa. The church was completed in 1661 and is part of the World Heritage Site, Churches and convents of Goa.

== History ==
Three Italian priests of the Theatine order arrived in India to preach Christianity in 1639. In 1643, they began work on a hospital, but were banished by the Portuguese viceroy Filipe Mascarenhas. However, the leader of the Italian priests, Pedro Avitabili, went to Portugal and convinced king John IV of Portugal that their working with the Portuguese priests in Goa would be in the interests of Christianity. The king permitted the construction of the hospital in 1650, and in 1655 they also managed to obtain permission for setting up the church and a small convent near it. The church's construction was under the supervision of Italian architects, Carlo Ferrarini and Francesco Maria Milazzo.

The church is considered to have been modeled on St. Peter's Basilica in Vatican City. Seventeenth century travelers Giovanni Francesco Gemelli Careri and Pietro Della Valle have also likened the church to the Sant'Andrea della Valle, which is the seat of the Theatine order.

== Structure ==
The church is in the form of a Greek cross and has a large dome with Latin inscriptions from the Gospel of Matthew on its inside. The Corinthian style facade of the church has four granite statues of Saints Peter, Paul, John the Evangelist and Matthew. The church has seven altars, with the main altar dedicated to Our Lady of Providence. The main altar is based on the one at Church of San Nicolo, Verona, and was ordered in 1713 by the Theatines under the patronage of Cosimo III de' Medici, Grand Duke of Tuscany. There are three altars on each side of the entrance, with the altar to Saint Cajetan is located on the right.

Underneath the cupola on a raised square platform is a well, which is currently covered. The presence of the well has led to the belief that the site once had a Hindu temple. The cemetery below the altar was in 1842 converted into a vault for the bodies of dead Portuguese soldiers, before dispatching them to Lisbon.

== See also ==
- 17th-century Western domes

== Gallery ==
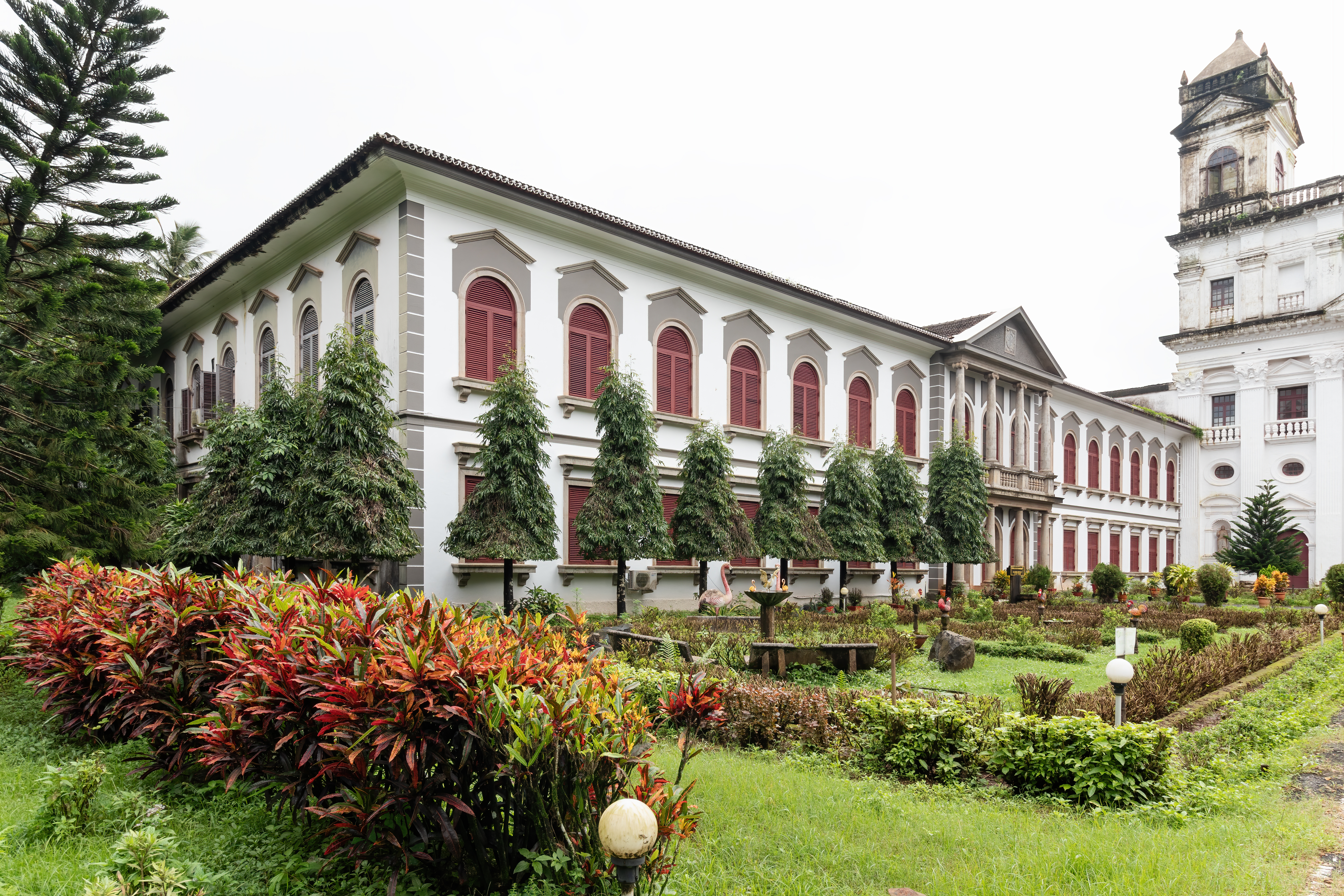
Pastoral Institute St Pius X within the church

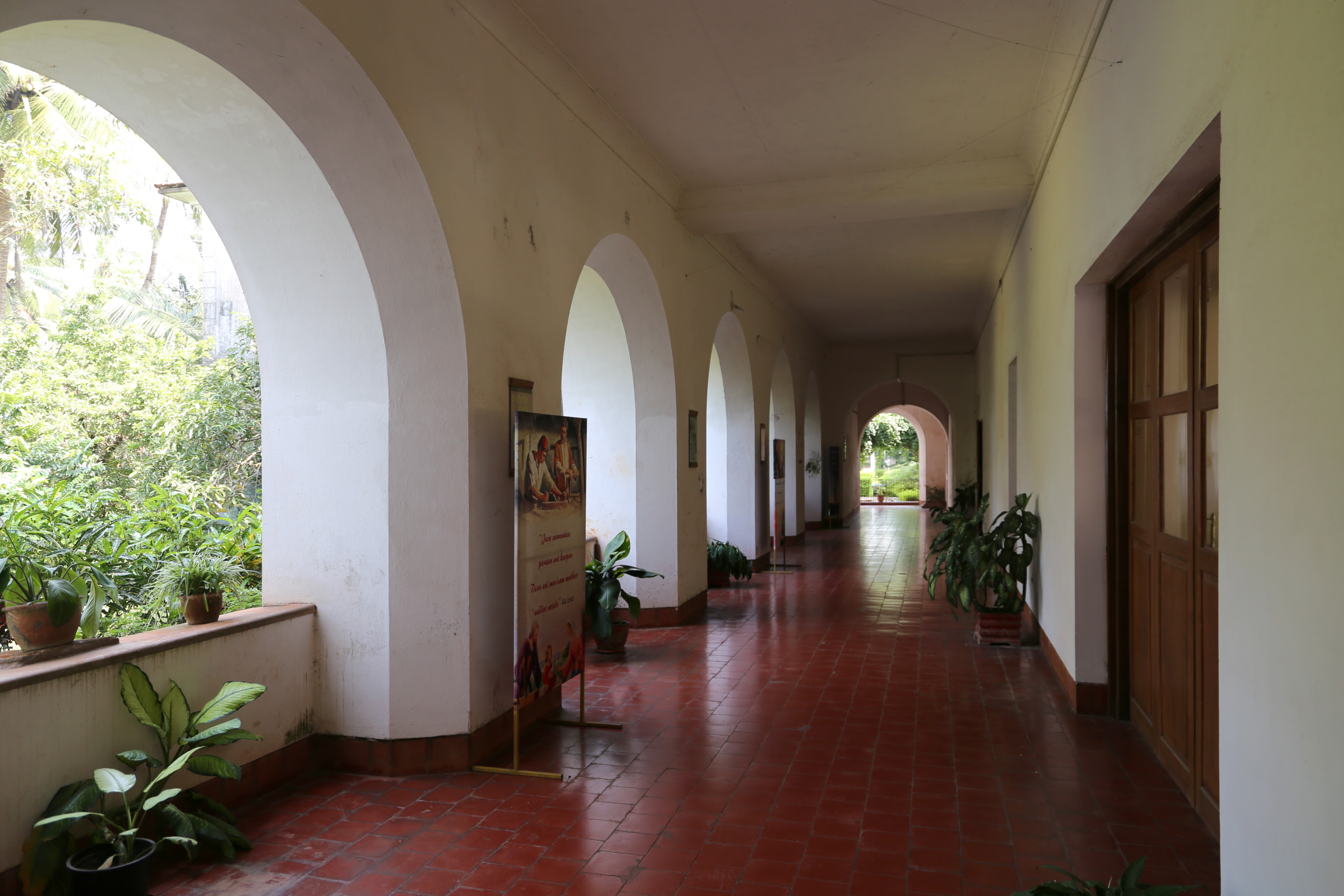
Corridor in Pastoral Institute St Pius X

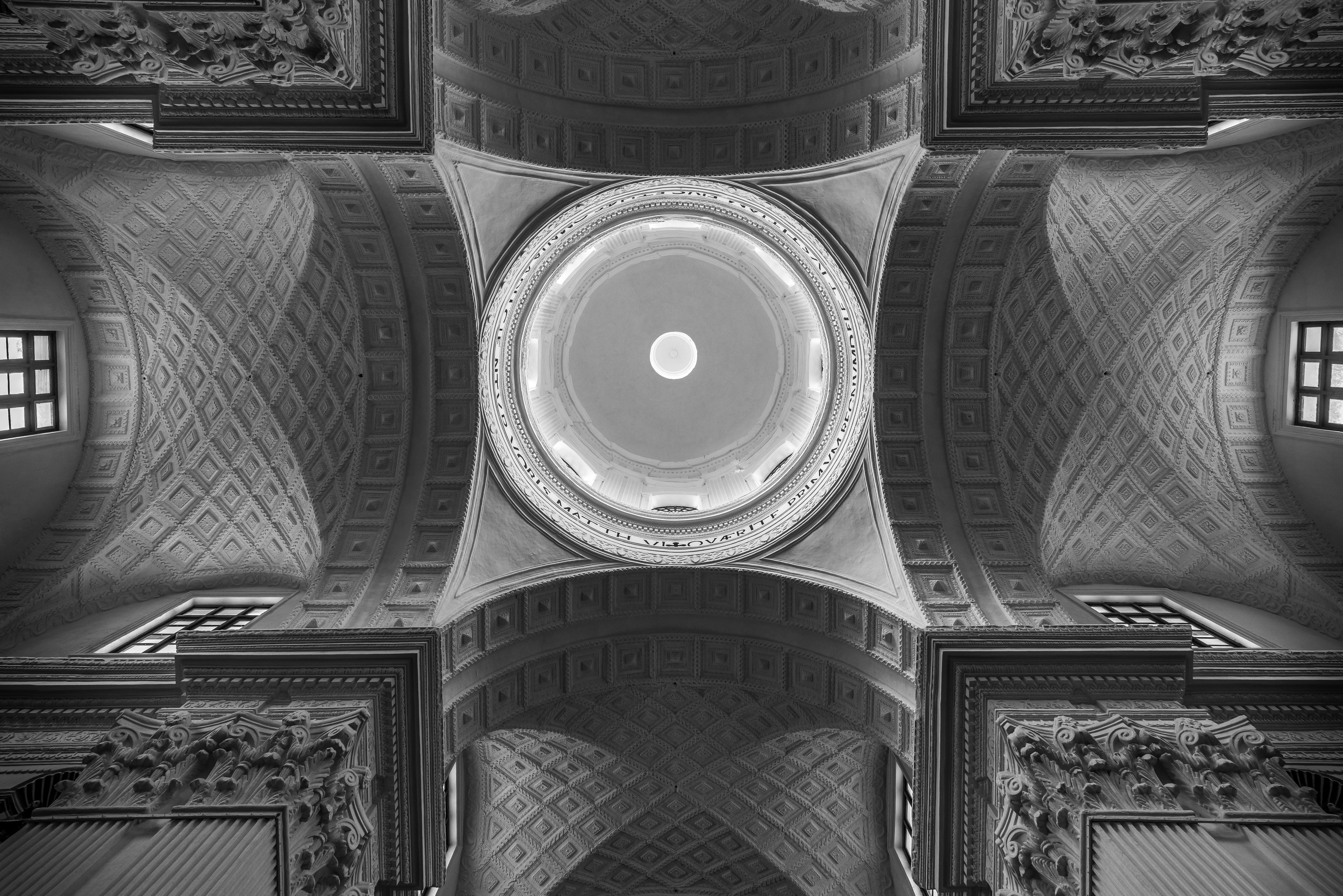
Dome of the church

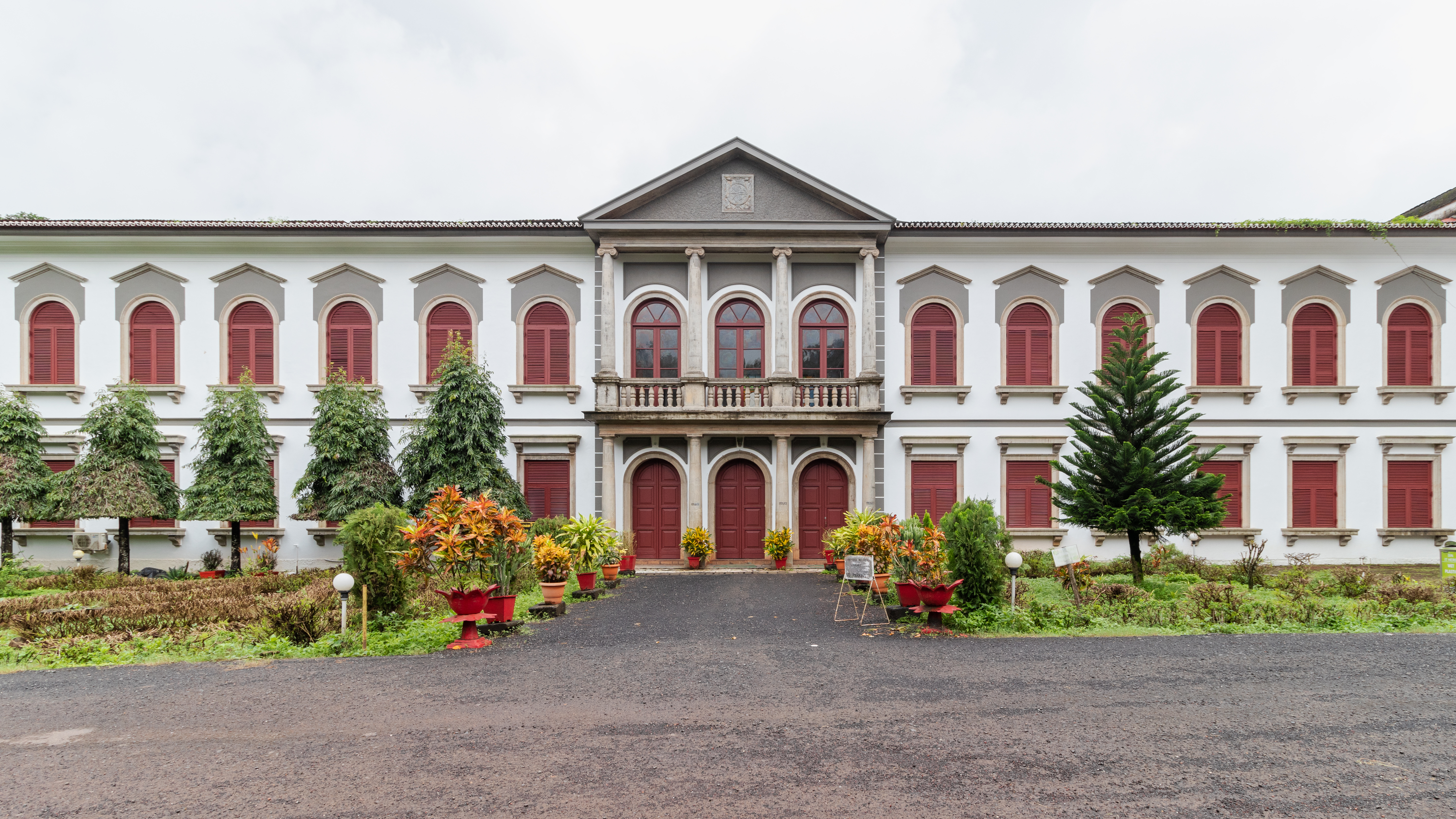
Elevation of Pastoral Institute St Pius X

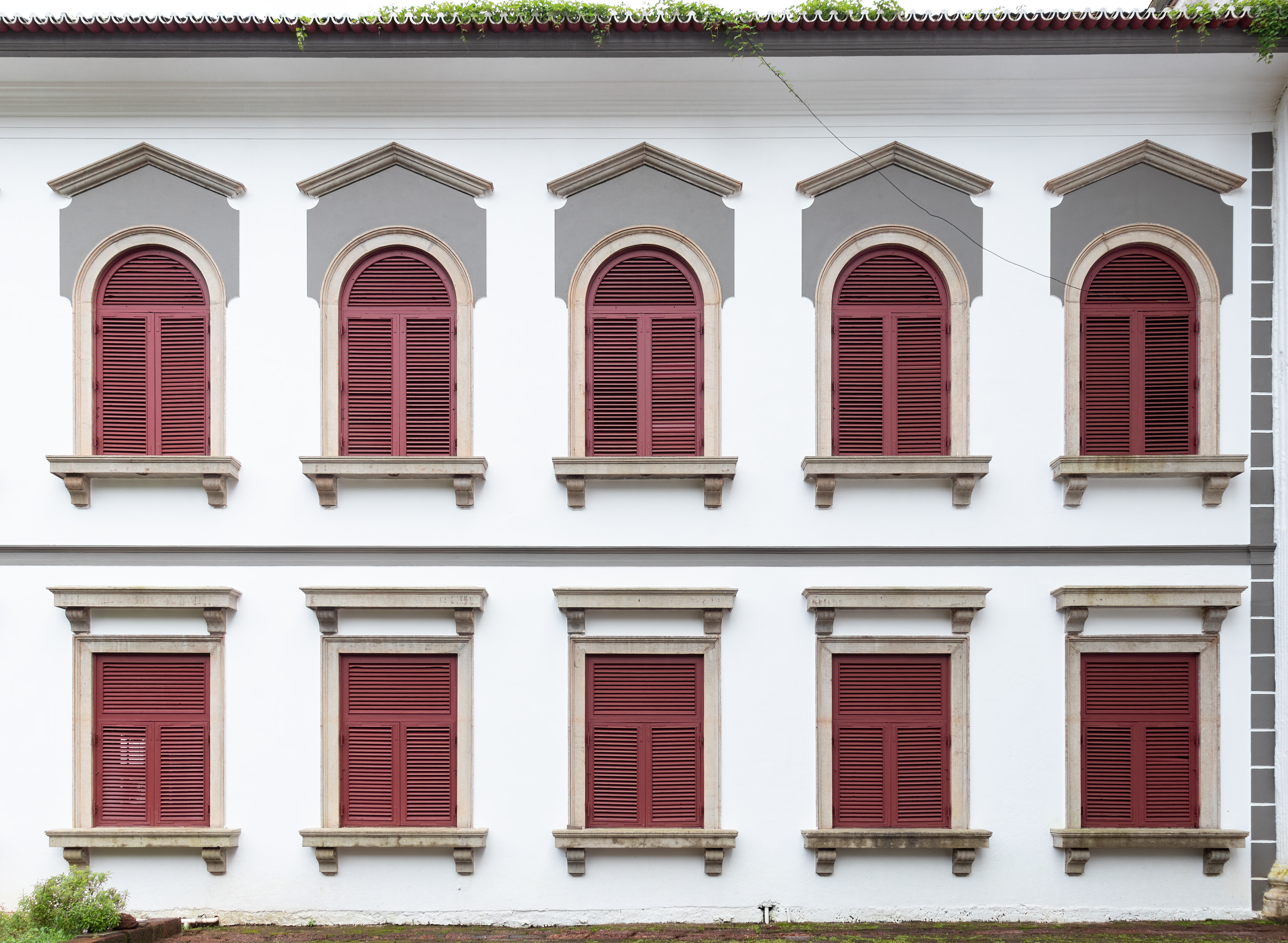
Windows on the Pastoral Institute St Pius X

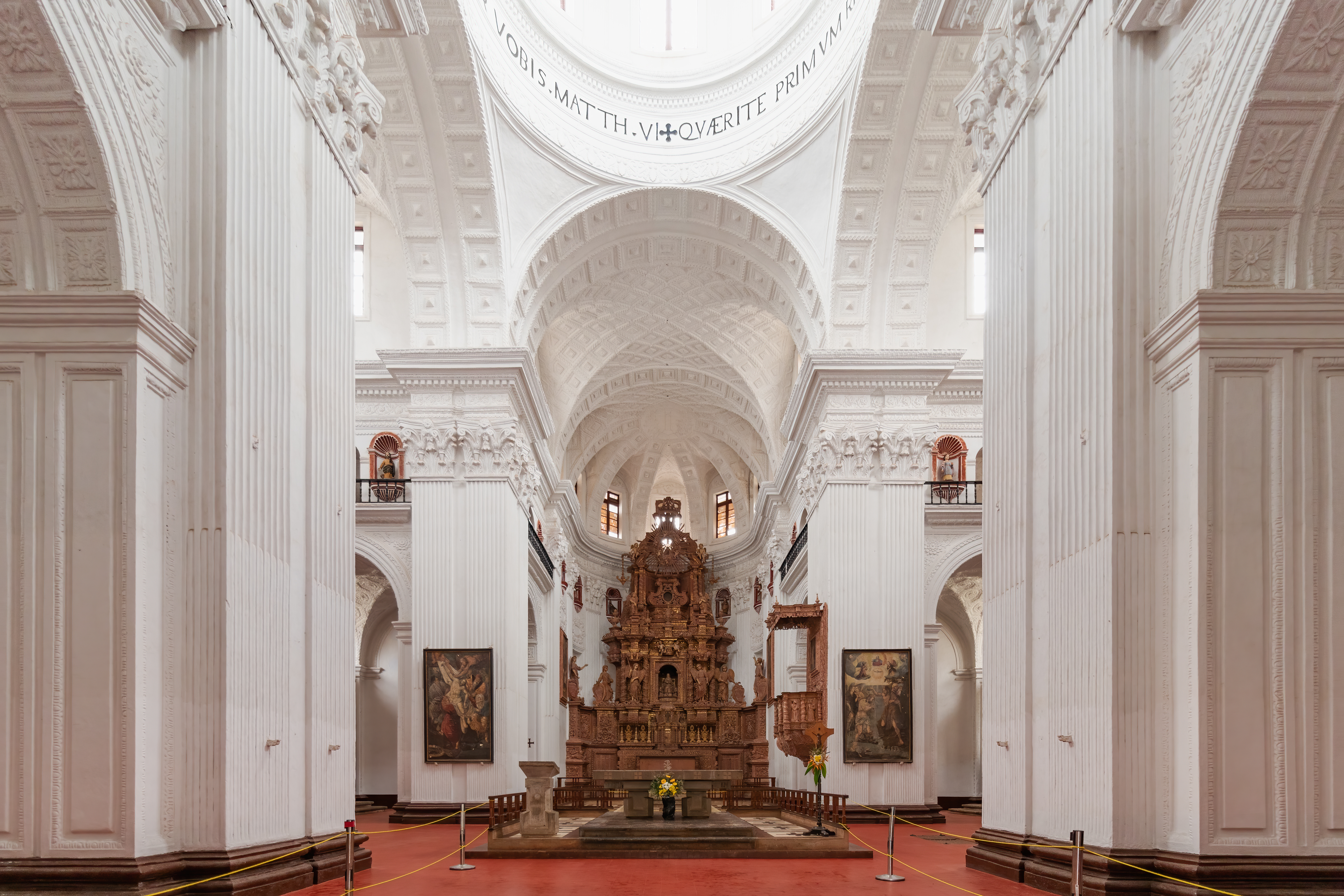
Inside the St. Cajetan Church
