= Lorenzo de San Nicolás =

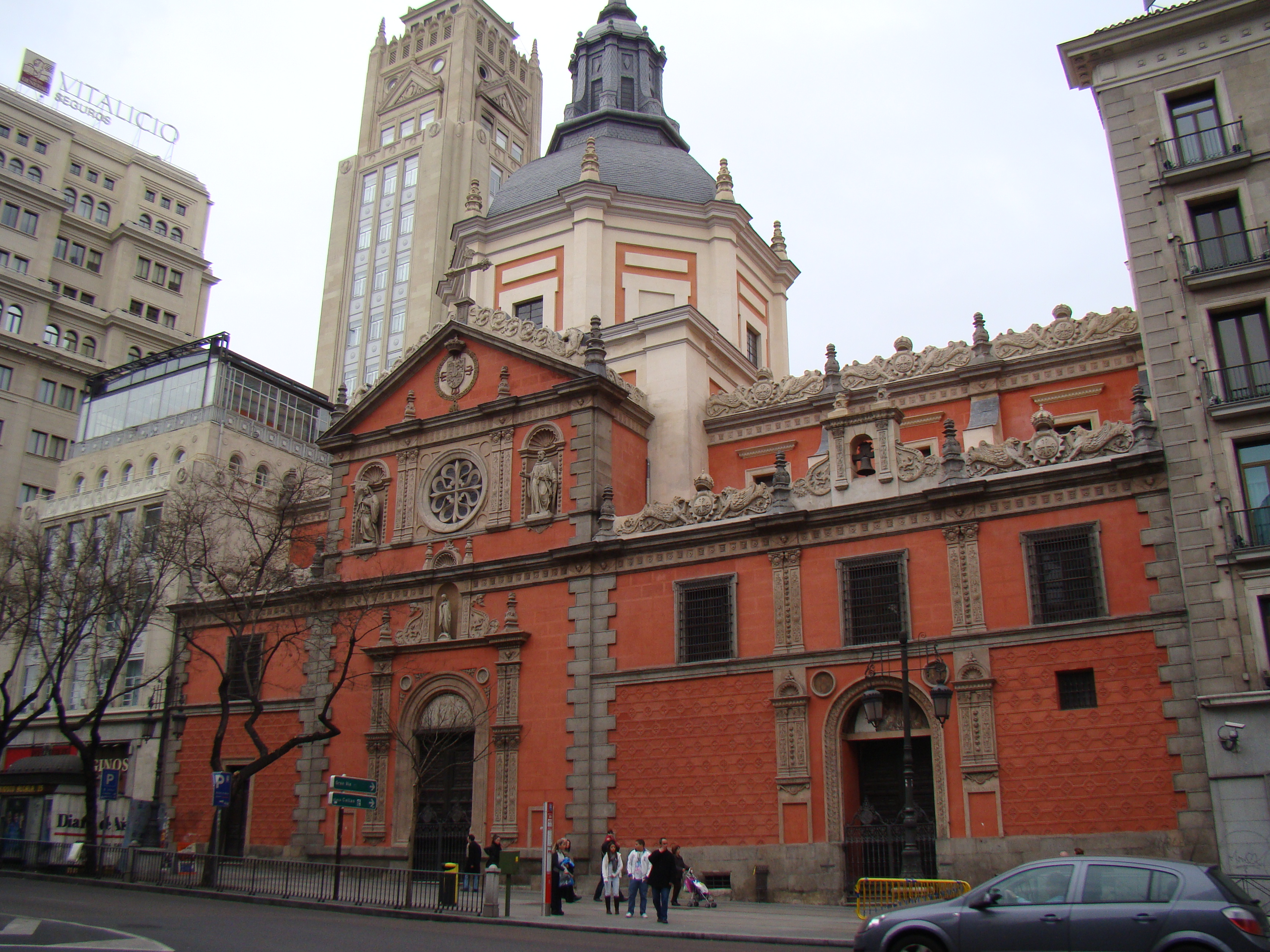
The Calatravas Church in Madrid. The original design is attributed to Lorenzo de San Nicolás.

Lorenzo de San Nicolás (1593–1679) was a Spanish architect. As he was a member of a religious order, he was known by the Spanish language title fray (a shortening of the word fraile, used by friars and members of certain religious orders).

Born in Madrid, his double career as an architect and a friar began in his teens. He was influenced by his father who was also an architect and, in later life, an Augustinian friar.

He wrote and published Arte y Uso de la Arquitectura, in two tomes (1639, 1664), an influential book in baroque Spain and Spanish America of the 17th and 18th centuries.
