= Quincha =

Traditional construction system

Quincha is a traditional construction system that uses, fundamentally, wood and cane or giant reed forming an earthquake-proof framework that is covered in mud and plaster.

== History ==
Quincha is a Spanish term widely known in Latin America, borrowed from Quechua qincha (kincha in Kichwa). Even though Spanish and Portuguese are closely related languages, in this case, the Portuguese equivalent is completely different: Pau-a-pique.

Historically, quincha has been utilized in the Spanish and Portuguese colonies throughout the different regions of the Americas. The construction technology is said to have existed for at least 8,000 years. In Peru, it is a popular construction design in the coastal regions. It is also adopted in urban centers after the incidence of earthquakes such as the case of the rebuilding of the city of Trujillo after the 1759 earthquake.

== Construction ==
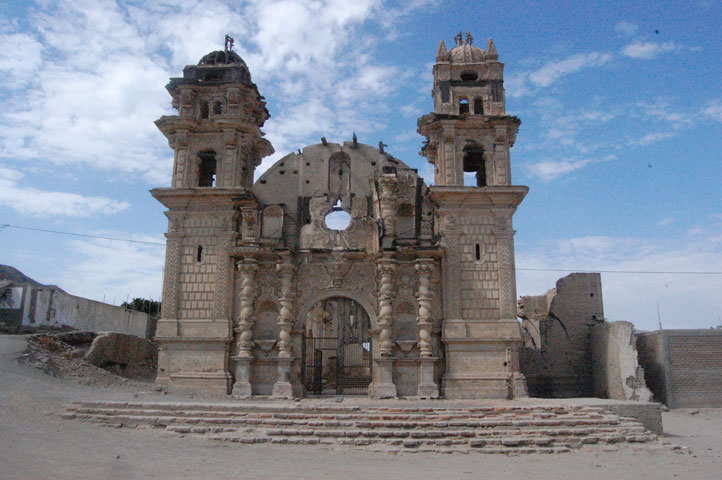
The Iglesia Jesuita de San Jose used quincha technology to build its ornate facade.

The framework or wattle is a main feature of traditional quincha. It is constructed by interweaving pieces of wood, cane, or bamboo and is covered with a mixture of mud and straw (or daub). It is then covered on both sides with a thin lime plaster finish, which serves as a sort of wall or ceiling panels.

Quincha is known for its flexibility since it can be shaped into different designs. For example, the builders of the church at San Jose at Ingenio, Nazca modified quincha to construct its ornate twin-towered facade. Its resistance to earthquake is attributed to the combination of heavy mass (used for thermal insulation) and timber-frame structure. The lattice design of its framework also provides the quincha building stability, allowing it to shake during an earthquake without damage.

A modern iteration of quincha is called quincha metallica, a method developed by the Chilean architect Marcelo Cortés. In this system, steel and wielded wire mesh are used instead of bamboo or cane to create the matrix that holds the mud, which is also improved through the addition of lime to control the clay's expansion and water impermeability.

== See also ==
- Wattle and daub
