= Church of las Calatravas (Madrid) =

Cultural property in Madrid, Spain

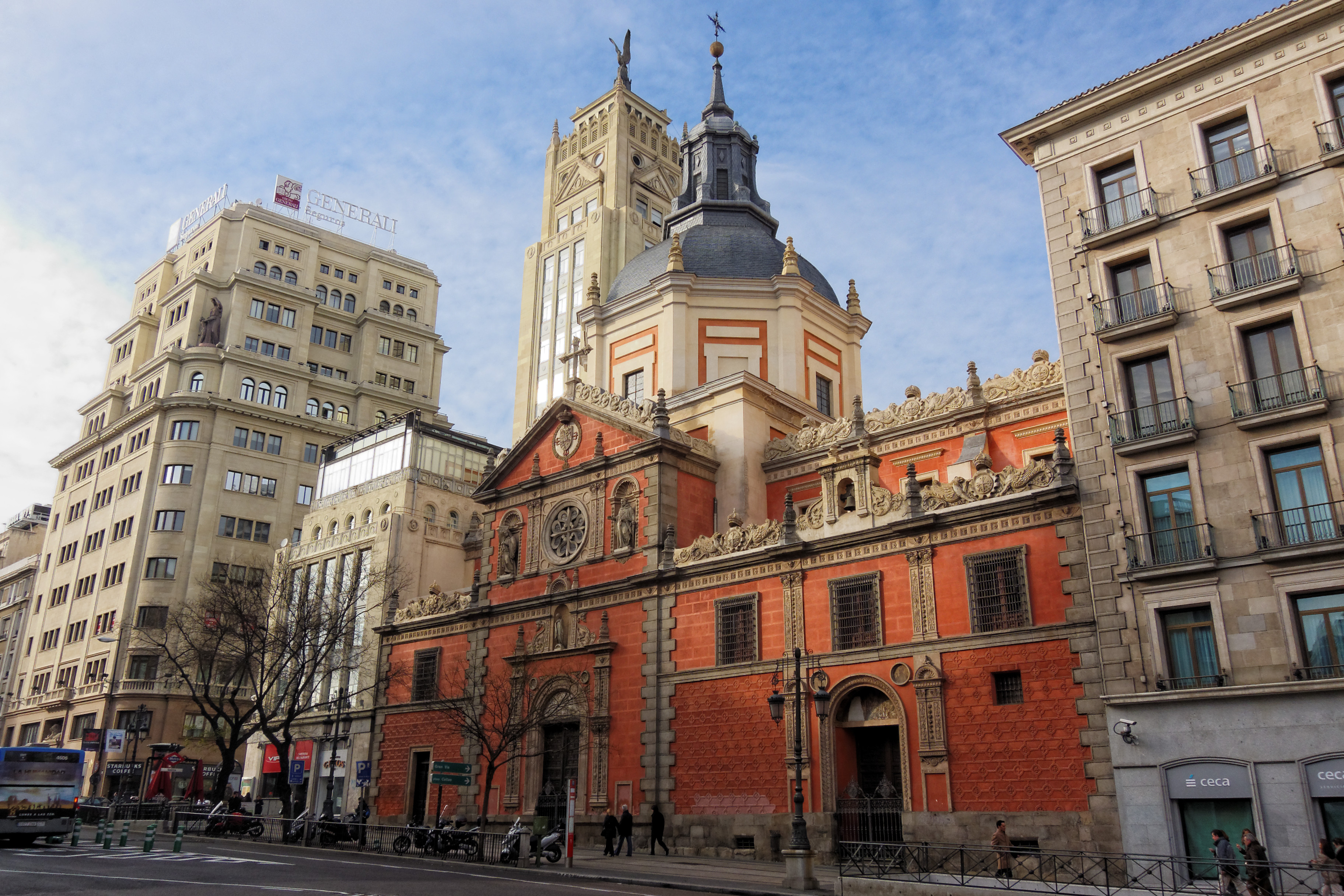
- Interactive map of the Church of las Calatravas area

General information
- Location: Calle de Alcalá 25, Madrid, Spain
- Coordinates: 40.418236°N 3.69908°W

The Church of las Calatravas (Spanish: Iglesia de las Calatravas) is a church located in Madrid, Spain. It was declared Bien de Interés Cultural in 1995. The external façade was revamped in 1866 following a project by Juan de Madrazo.

== See also ==
- Catholic Church in Spain
- List of oldest church buildings
- 17th-century Western domes
