= Fredy =

Fredy is a given name, and may refer to:

- Fredy Bareiro (born 1982), Paraguayan football player
- Fredy Barth (born 1979), Swiss racing driver
- Fredy Clue (born 1994 or 1995), Swedish artist and musician
- Fredy Glanzmann (born 1963), Swiss Nordic combined skier
- Fredy Hernández (born 1978), Colombian race walker
- Fredy Montero Colombian footballer with Sounders FC
- Fredy Otárola, Peruvian politician
- Fredy Perlman (1934–1985), author, publisher and activist
- Fredy Reyna (1917–2001), Venezuelan musician, arranger and performer
- Fredy Schmidtke (born 1961), track cyclist
- "Fredy" (song) (also recorded as "Freddy"), a 1955 song

== See also ==
- Federico
- Fred (disambiguation)
- Freddie (disambiguation)
- Freddo
- Freddy (disambiguation)
- Frédéric
- Frederick (given name)
- Frederico
- Fredi
- Fredrik
- Fredro
- Friedrich (disambiguation)
- Fryderyk (disambiguation)
