= Frederic (given name) =

- Pronunciation: French: [fʁe.de.ʁik]
- Gender: Male
- Name day: July 18

Origin
- Origin: Germanic
- Meaning: "peaceful ruler"
- Region of origin: France

Other names
- Related names: Frederick, Frédéric, Fritz, Rick, Ricky, Fred, Freddie, Alfred, Red, Friedrich, Federico,

Frederic is a given name. For its origin, see Frederick. Notable persons with that name include:

== Arts ==
- Frederic William Burton (1816–1900), Irish painter and curator
- Frédéric Chopin (1810–1849), Polish composer and virtuoso pianist
- Frederic Edwin Church (1826–1900), American landscape painter
- Frédéric Bazille (1841–1870), French Impressionist painter
- Frédéric Fromet (born 1971), French chansonnier
- Frederic Leighton, 1st Baron Leighton (1830–1896), English painter and sculptor
- Frederic Remington (1861–1909), American painter, illustrator, sculptor, and writer
- Frederic Storck (1872–1942), Romanian sculptor
- Frederic Matys Thursz (1930–1992), Moroccan painter, teacher
- Frederic Tuten (born 1936), American novelist, short story writer and essayist

== In politics and government ==
- Frederic Bennett (1918–2002), British politician
- Frederic René Coudert, Jr. (1898–1972), American politician from New York
- Frederic René Coudert Sr. (1832–1903), American lawyer
- Frederic William Maitland (1850–1906), English jurist and historian
- Frederic Maugham, 1st Viscount Maugham (1866–1958), British lawyer and judge
- Frederic M. Sackett (1868–1941), American politician and diplomat from Kentucky
- Frederic C. Walcott (1869–1949), American politician from Connecticut
- Fredric Wise (1871–1928), British Conservative Party politician

== Other ==
- Frederic M. Ashley (1870–1960), American architect
- Frederic Charles Bartlett (1886–1969), British psychologist
- Frederic Berthold (born 1991), Austrian World Cup alpine ski racer
- Frederic C. Billingsley (1921–2002), American engineer
- Frédéric Bourdillon (born 1991), French-Israeli basketball player in the Israel Basketball Premier League
- Frederic Lister Burk (1862–1924), Canadian-born American educator, university president, and educational theorist
- Frederic Charles Dreyer (1878–1956), officer of the Royal Navy
- Frederic Friedel (born 1945), German German chess player, publisher and businessman
- Frederic Gehring, American Catholic priest
- Frederic Hsieh (1945–1999), Chinese-American realtor and investor
- Frederic B. Ingram, American businessman whose jail sentence for bribery was commuted by President Jimmy Carter and who renounced his US citizenship
- Frederic North (1866–1921), Australian civil servant and sportsman
- Frédéric Saldmann (born 1953), French cardiologist and author of books on preventive medicine
- Frederic Walker (cricketer) (1829–1889), English cricketer

In fictional characters:

- Frederic, the pirate apprentice of Gilbert and Sullivan's comic opera The Pirates of Penzance
- Frédéric François Chopin, protagonist in Eternal Sonata, based on the composer of the same name
- Frederic Henry, the protagonist of the novel A Farewell to Arms.
- King Frederic, a recurring character from Tangled: The Series who is ruler of the island kingdom of Corona and overprotective father of Rapunzel, its long-lost princess

== See also ==
- Federico
- Fred (disambiguation)
- Freddo
- Freddy (disambiguation)
- Frédéric
- Frederick (given name)
- Frederico
- Fredrik
- Friedrich (disambiguation)
- Fryderyk (disambiguation)
