= Fredi =

Fredi may refer to:

- Fredi (Valencian pilota) (born 1957), retired Valencian pilota professional player
- Fredi Bobic (born 1971), German football striker
- Fredi González (born 1964), Cuban current manager of the Atlanta Braves
- Fredi Walker, American actress
- Fredi Washington (1903-1994), African-American film actress
- Fredi (singer), Finnish singer born Matti Kalevi Siitonen

== See also ==
- Federico
- Fred (disambiguation)
- Freddie (disambiguation)
- Freddo
- Freddy (disambiguation)
- Frédéric
- Frederick (given name)
- Frederico
- Fredrik
- Fredro
- Fredy
- Friedrich (disambiguation)
- Fryderyk (disambiguation)
