= Federico =

- Gender: Male
- Language: Italian

Origin
- Meaning: Peaceful ruler
- Region of origin: Italy

Other names
- Variant form: Frederick
- Nicknames: Fede, Fred, Freddy, Kiko, Quico, Rico, Fed

Federico (Spanish pronunciation: [feðeˈɾiko]; Italian: [fedeˈriːko]) is a male given name and surname. It is a form of Frederick, most commonly found in Spanish, Portuguese and Italian.

== People ==
=== Nobility ===
- Federico II di Svevia, Holy Roman Emperor
- Federico I Gonzaga, Marquess of Mantua
- Federico II Gonzaga, Duke of Mantua

=== Arts and entertainment ===
- Federico Ágreda, Venezuelan composer and DJ
- Federico Aguilar Alcuaz, renowned Filipino painter
- Federico Andahazi, Argentine writer and psychologist
- Federico Aubele, Argentine singer-songwriter
- Federico Ayos, Argentine actor
- Federico Canessi (1905–1977), Mexican sculptor, muralist
- Federico Casagrande, Italian jazz guitarist
- Federico Castelluccio, Italian-American actor who is most famous for his role as Furio Giunta on the HBO TV series, The Sopranos
- Federico Cesari, Italian actor
- Federico Cortese, Italian conductor, Music Director of the Boston Youth Symphony Orchestras and the Harvard Radcliffe Orchestra
- Federico D'Elía, Argentine actor
- Federico Elizalde, Filipino marksman and musician
- Federico Falco (writer), Argentine writer
- Federico Fellini, Italian film-maker and director
- Federico Finchelstein, Argentine historian
- Federico García Lorca, Spanish poet and playwright
- Federico Hindermann (1921−2012), Swiss publisher, translator, and writer
- Federico Ielapi (born 2010), Italian actor
- Federico Jeanmaire, Argentine writer
- Federico Jusid, Argentine composer
- Federico Kirbus, Argentine journalist, writer, and researcher
- Federico Luppi, Argentine film, TV, radio and theatre actor
- Federico Moura, Argentine musician
- Federico Ricci, Italian composer
- Fede Vigevani (born 1994 or 1995), Uruguayan YouTuber and musician

=== Sports ===
- Federico Almerares, Argentine retired footballer
- Federico Álvarez, Argentine footballer
- Federico Andrada, Argentine footballer
- Federico Anselmo, Argentine footballer
- Federico Martín Aramburú, Argentine rugby union player
- Federico Arias, Argentine retired footballer
- Federico Astudillo, Argentine retired footballer
- Federico Azcárate, Argentine retired footballer
- Federico Barrionuevo, Argentine retired footballer
- Federico Basavilbaso, Argentine retired footballer
- Federico Bernardeschi, Italian footballer
- Federico Bessone (footballer, born 1972), Argentine defender
- Federico Bessone (footballer, born 1984), Argentine coach and former left-back
- Federico Bonansea, Argentine footballer
- Federico Bongioanni, Argentine retired footballer
- Federico Bravo, Argentine footballer
- Federico Browne, Argentine retired tennis player
- Federico Bruno (born 1993), Argentine distance runner
- Federico Capece, Argentine retired footballer
- Federico Carrizo, Argentine footballer
- Federico Cartabia, Argentine footballer
- Federico Castro, Argentine footballer
- Federico Chiesa, Italian footballer currently playing for Liverpool
- Federico Cichero, Argentine cross-country skier
- Federico Coria, Argentine tennis player
- Federico Costa, Argentine footballer
- Federico Cristiani, Italian para swimmer
- Federico Crivelli, Argentine retired footballer
- Federico de Beni, Italian road bicycle racer
- Federico del Bonis, Argentine tennis player
- Federico Domínguez (footballer, born 1976), Argentine footballer
- Federico Edwards, Argentine footballer
- Federico Falco (table tennis), Italian para table tennis player
- Federico Falcone, Argentine footballer
- Federico Fattori, Argentine footballer
- Federico Fazio, Argentine footballer
- Federico Fernández (footballer), Argentine footballer
- Federico Fernández (equestrian), Mexican equestrian
- Federico García (skier), Chilean alpine skier
- Federico Gastón Fernández, Argentine handball player
- Federico Flores, Argentine footballer
- Federico Freire, Argentine footballer
- Federico Garcín, Uruguayan basketball player
- Federico Gattoni, Argentine footballer
- Federico Gay (cyclist), Italian road bicycle racer
- Federico Gay (footballer), Argentine defender
- Federico Gil (sport shooter), Argentine Olympic shooter
- Federico Girotti, Argentine footballer
- Federico Gomes Gerth, Argentine footballer
- Federico González, Argentine footballer
- Federico Grabich, Argentine swimmer
- Federico Haberkorn, Argentine footballer
- Federico Higuaín, Argentine retired footballer
- Federico Insúa, Argentine retired footballer
- Federico Kammerichs, Argentine retired basketball player
- Federico Kleger, Argentine hammer thrower
- Federico Lagorio, Argentine retired footballer
- Federico Lanzillota, Argentine footballer
- Federico Laurito, Argentine footballer
- Federico León, Argentine retired footballer
- Federico Lértora, Argentine footballer
- Federico Lopez, Puerto Rican basketball player
- Federico Lussenhoff, Argentine retired footballer
- Federico Luzzi, Italian tennis player
- Federico Macheda, Italian footballer
- Federico Mancarella (born 1992), Italian paracanoeist
- Federico Mancinelli, Argentine footballer
- Federico Mancuello, Argentine footballer
- Federico Maranges (born 2001), American football player
- Federico Martorell, Argentine retired footballer
- Federico Mateos, Argentine footballer
- Federico Mazur, Argentine footballer
- Federico Méndez, Argentine rugby union player
- Federico Milo, Argentine footballer
- Federico Mociulsky, Argentine footballer
- Federico Molinari (footballer), Argentine defender
- Federico Molinari (gymnast), Argentine artistic gymnast
- Federico Moreira, Uruguayan road bicycle racer and track cyclist
- Federico Muñoz, Colombian road cyclist
- Federico Murillo, Argentine footballer
- Federico Mussini, Italian college basketball player
- Federico Navarro, Argentine footballer
- Federico Nieto, Argentine footballer
- Federico Paulucci, Argentine footballer
- Federico Pereyra (footballer), Argentine defender
- Federico Pereyra (volleyball), Argentine volleyball player
- Federico Perez Ponsa, Argentine chess player
- Federico Piovaccari, Italian footballer
- Federico Pizarro (footballer), Argentine midfielder
- Federico Pizarro (handballer), Argentine right wing
- Federico Poggi, Argentine retired footballer
- Federico Presedo, Argentine footballer
- Federico Rasic, Argentine footballer
- Federico Rasmussen, Argentine footballer
- Federico Redondo, Argentine footballer
- Federico Rose (born 2004), Canadian soccer player
- Federico Rosso, Argentine footballer
- Federico Ruiz, Argentine footballer
- Federico Sacchi, Argentine footballer
- Federico Sardella, Argentine footballer
- Federico Scoppa, Argentine footballer
- Federico Serra Miras, Argentine retired rugby union player
- Federico Silvestre, Argentine footballer
- Federico Staksrud, Argentine professional tennis and pickleball player
- Federico Todeschini, Argentine retired rugby union player
- Federico Turienzo, Argentine footballer
- Federico Vairo, Argentine footballer
- Federico Valverde, Uruguayan footballer
- Federico Van Lacke, Argentine basketball player
- Federico Varela, Argentine footballer
- Federico Vázquez, Argentine footballer
- Federico Vega, Argentine footballer
- Federico Vera, Argentine footballer
- Federico Versaci, Argentine footballer
- Federico Vietto, Argentine footballer
- Federico Matias Vieyra, Argentine handball player
- Federico Vilar, Argentine football manager and former player
- Federico Villagra, Argentine rally driver
- Federico Villegas (BMX rider), Argentine BMX rider
- Federico Vismara, Argentine retired footballer
- Federico Wilde, Argentine footballer

=== Military ===
- Federico da Montefeltro, mercenary captain (condottieri) of the Italian Renaissance, lord of Urbino
- Federico de Brandsen, French-Argentine colonel
- Federico Rauch, German-Argentine colonel
- Federico Spinola, Italian naval commander in Spanish Habsburg service

=== Politics ===
- Federico Angelini, Argentine politician
- Federico Arcos, Spanish anarchist
- Federico Brito (1905–1969), Chilean lawyer and parliamentarian
- Federico Chávez, Paraguay politician, soldier and President of Paraguay
- Federico Degetau, Puerto Rican politician, lawyer, and author
- Federico D'Incà, Italian politician
- Federico Döring, Mexican right-wing politician
- Federico Errázuriz Echaurren, Chilean politician
- Federico Errázuriz Zañartu, Chilean politician
- Federico Fagioli, Argentine politician
- Federico Fernández de Monjardín, Argentine politician, journalist and historian
- Federico Frigerio, Argentine politician
- Federico Gozi, Captain Regent of San Marino
- Federico Helguera, Argentine politician
- Federico Páez, President of Ecuador
- Federico Pinedo, Argentine politician
- Federico Storani, Argentine politician
- Federico Sturzenegger, Argentine politician
- Federico Tinoco Granados, President of Costa Rica
- Federico Villegas (diplomat), Argentine career diplomat

=== Science, engineering, and technology ===
- Federico Albert (conservationist) (1867–1928), Chilean botanist, ornithologist and silviculturist
- Federico Capasso, one of the inventors of the quantum cascade laser
- Federico Kurtz, Argentine-German botanist
- Federico Mena, Mexican computer programmer
- Federico Rodríguez Hertz, Argentine mathematician
- Federico Schickendantz, Argentine-German scientist

=== Business ===
- Federico Gastaldi, Argentine businessman
- Federico Lacroze, Argentine businessman and railway entrepreneur

=== Other ===
- Federico José Pagura, Argentine religious leader

== People with the surname Federico ==
- Domingo Federico, Argentine bandoneon player
- Giovanni Federico, Italian-German footballer
- Leopoldo Federico, Argentine tango bandoneonist
- Pasquale Joseph Federico, American patent attorney and mathematician

== See also ==
- Frederick (disambiguation)
- Fred (disambiguation)
- Freddie (disambiguation)
- Freddo
- Freddy (disambiguation)
- Frédéric
- Frederico
- Fredrik
- Fredro
- Fredy
- Friedrich (disambiguation)
- Fryderyk (disambiguation)
