= Freddy (given name) =

Freddy (also Freddi and Freddie) is a unisex given name. It is often used by both men and women whose names contain the Germanic element -fred, such as Frederick, Frederica, and Alfred. It may be used a diminutive of any name containing "fred", regardless of origin, as with Freddy Adu and Freddie Benson, both Ghanaians named Fredua.

== People ==
=== In sports ===
- Freddy (Angolan footballer) (born 1979), Angolan footballer
- Freddy Adu (born 1989), American soccer player
- Freddie Banks (born 1965), American basketball player
- Freddie Barnes (born 1986), American football wide receiver
- Freddie Beck (1904–1987), English golfer
- Freddie Bishop (born 1990), American football player
- Freddie Bradley (born 1970), American football running back
- Freddie Braun (born 1988), American soccer player
- Freddie Brorsson (born 1997), Swedish footballer
- Fred Brown (basketball) (born 1948), American former National Basketball Association player known as "Downtown Freddie Brown"
- Freddie Brown (cricketer) (1910–1991), former cricketer and cricket commentator
- Freddie Brown (footballer) (1878–1939), footballer for Stoke and West Bromwich Albion
- Freddie Bunce (1938–1991), English footballer
- Freddie Burch (1886–?), English footballer
- Freddie Calthorpe (1892–1935), English cricketer
- Freddie Clarke (born 1992), English rugby union player
- Freddie Clayton (1873–1946), English first-class cricketer
- Freddie Coleman (born 1991), Scottish cricketer
- Freddie Crum (1912–1987), American basketball player
- Freddie Douglas (born 1954), National Football League wide receiver
- Freddie Dunkelman (1920–2010), British ice hockey player
- Freddie Elizalde (born 1940), Filipino former swimmer
- Freddie Eriksson (born 1981), Swedish motorcycle speedway rider
- Freddie Fenton (1879–?), English footballer
- Freddy Fernández (actor) (1934–1995), Mexican actor
- Freddy Fernández (footballer) (born 1974), Costa Rican footballer
- Brad Fittler (born 1972), Australian rugby league player nicknamed "Freddy"
- Andrew Flintoff (born 1977), English cricketer nicknamed "Freddie"
- Freddie Fox (footballer) (1898–1968), English football goalkeeper
- Freddie Fox (jockey) (1888–1945), British horse racing jockey
- Freddie Freeman (born 1989), American-Canadian baseball player
- Freddie Frith (1909–1988), British Grand Prix motorcycle road racing world champion
- Freddy Stephen Fuller, 1960s Canadian amateur boxing champion
- Freddy García (born 1976), Venezuelan who pitched for several Major League Baseball teams
- Freddie Garcia (born 1958), Mexican-American soccer player
- Freddy García (infielder) (born 1972), baseball infielder
- Freddy García (football manager) (born 1959), Peruvian football manager
- Freddy García (footballer) (born 1977), Guatemalan footballer
- Freddie Gillespie (born 1997), American basketball player in the Israeli Basketball Premier League
- Alfredo Razon Gonzalez (born 1978), Filipino football player nicknamed "Freddy"
- Freddy González (born 1977), Venezuelan long-distance runner
- Fredy González (born 1975), Colombian road racing cyclist
- Freddie Goss, American basketball coach
- Freddie Hubalde (born 1953), Filipino retired basketball player
- Freddie Kitchens (born 1974), American football coach
- Freddy Leach (1897–1981), American Major League Baseball player
- Freddie Lish (born 1988), Thai-American basketball player
- Freddie Martino (born 1991), American football player
- Freddie Miller (boxer) (1911–1962), American boxer
- Freddie Miller (rugby league) (died 1960), British rugby league footballer of the 1940s and 1950s
- Freddy Moncada (born 1973), Colombian retired road cyclist
- Freddy Montaña (born 1982), Colombian road cyclist
- Freddy Murray (born 2003), Irish tennis player
- Freddie Joe Nunn (born 1962), American former National Football League player
- Freddy Ovett (born 1994), British-born Australian cyclist
- Freddie Pethard (born 1950), Scottish retired footballer
- Freddie Roach (boxing) (born 1960), American boxing trainer and former professional boxer
- Freddy Rodríguez (baseball) (1924–2009), former Major League Baseball pitcher
- Freddy Rodriguez (cyclist) (born 1973), American professional road racing cyclist
- Freddy Sanchez (born 1977), American retired Major League Baseball player
- Freddie Solomon (1953–2012), American National Football League player
- Freddie Solomon (American football, born 1972), American retired National Football League player
- Freddie Spencer (born 1961), American former world champion motorcycle racer
- Freddie Steele (1912–1984), American world middleweight boxing champion and actor
- Freddie Steele (footballer) (1916–1976), English footballer and manager
- Freddie Summers (1947–1994), American National Football League player
- Freddie Swain (born 1998), American football player
- Freddy Vargas (born 1982), Venezuelan road cyclist
- Freddy Zamora (born 1998), American baseball player
- Freddie Williams (speedway rider) (1926–2013), motorcycle speedway world champion
- Freddie Williams (athlete) (born 1962), Canadian track and field runner

=== Artists and entertainers ===
- Freddy, German soccer fan and social media personality
- Freddie Aguilar (born 1953), Filipino singer-songwriter and musician
- Freddie Bell (1931–2008), American musician, founder of the vocal group Freddie Bell and the Bellboys
- Freddy Beras-Goico (1940–2010), Dominican comedian, TV presenter, writer and media personality
- Freddie Brown (musician) (1940–2002), American musician
- Freddy Cannon (born 1936), American rock and roll singer
- Freddy Cole (1931–2020), American jazz singer and pianist, brother of Nat King Cole
- Freddie Colloca (born 1975), Argentine-American Christian musician, pianist, and worship leader
- Freddie Crump (died 1980), drummer from the United States
- Freddie Fisher (musician) (1904–1967), American musician
- Freddie Burke Frederick (1921–1986), American child actor
- Freddie Fox (actor) (born 1989), English actor
- Freddie Garrity (1936–2006), British singer and actor, frontman of the pop band Freddie and the Dreamers
- Freddie Gibbs (born 1982), American rapper and songwriter
- Freddie Green (1911–1987), American swing jazz guitarist
- Freddie Hart (1926–2018), stage name of Frederick Segrest, American country musician and songwriter
- Freddie Hubbard (1938–2008), American jazz trumpeter
- Freddie King (1934–1976), American blues guitarist and singer
- Freddie A. Lerche (born 1937), Danish painter
- Freddy Martin (1906–1983), American bandleader and tenor saxophonist
- Freddie Mercury (1946–1991), Zanzibarian-born musician, lead singer of the British rock band Queen
- Freddie Miller (broadcaster) (1929–1992), broadcaster and television personality in Atlanta, Georgia, United States
- Freddie Moore (1900–1992), American jazz drummer, washboarder, and singer
- Freddie Prinze (1954–1977), American actor and stand-up comedian
- Freddie Prinze Jr. (born 1976), American actor, son of the above
- Freddy Quinn (born 1931) or simply "Freddy", Austrian singer and actor
- Freddie Roach (organist) (1931–1980), American soul jazz musician
- Freddy Rodriguez (actor) (born 1975), American actor
- Freddy Rodríguez (artist) (1945–2022), Dominican Republic artist in the United States
- Freddie Smith (born 1988), American actor
- Freddie Starr (1943–2019), English comedian, impressionist, singer and actor born Frederick Leslie Fowell
- Freddie Stone (born 1947), American co-founder, guitarist, and vocalist of the band Sly and the Family Stone
- Freddie Washington (bassist), jazz-influenced bass guitarist
- Freddie Washington (pianist), American jazz pianist
- Freddy Wexler (born 1986), American producer, songwriter and entrepreneur
- Freddie Williams II (born 1977), comics artist
- Freddie Young (1902–1998), British cinematographer
- Freddie (singer) (born 1990), alias of Gábor Alfréd Fehérvári, Hungarian singer
- Freddie Anderson (1922–2001), Irish writer, playwright, author, poet and socialist
- Freddie Brocksieper (1912–1990), German jazz-musician, drummer, and bandleader
- Freddie Bruno (born 1978), American Christian hip hop musician
- Daddy Freddy (born 1965), Jamaican ragga vocalist

=== Politicians and businesspeople ===
- Freddy de Ruiter (born 1969), Norwegian politician
- Freddie M. Garcia (born 1944), Filipino business executive
- Freddy Heineken (1923–2002), Dutch businessman, chairman of the board and CEO of the Heineken brewing company
- Freddy Huayta (born 1968), Bolivian politician
- Freddy Numberi (born 1947), Indonesian politician
- Freddie Rodriguez (born 1965), American politician

=== Others ===
- Freddie Carpenter (1920–2003), Archdeacon of the Isle of Wight
- Freddy Deeb (born 1955), Lebanese-born American professional poker player
- Freddie Figgers (born 1989), computer programmer, inventor, and entrepreneur
- Alfredo Cantu Gonzalez (1946–1968), United States Marine Corps sergeant awarded the Medal of Honor, nicknamed "Freddy"
- Freddie Oversteegen (1925–2018), Dutch assassin during World War II
- Freddy Rouhani (born 1963 or 1964), Iranian-born American professional poker player
- Frederic Calland Williams (1911–1977), English engineer sometimes known as Freddie Williams
- Freddie Williams (businessman) (1942–2008), Scottish bookmaker

== Fictional characters ==
- Freddy Auratus, a golden hamster from The Golden Hamster Saga, written by Dietlof Reiche
- Freddie Benson, from iCarly
- Freddie Falcon, official mascot of the National Football League's Atlanta Falcons
- Freddie and Frieda Falcon, mascots of Bowling Green State University
- Freddy Fazbear, a character in the horror game Five Nights at Freddy's by Scott Cawthon
- Freddie Fear, in his own comic strip in the UK comic The Beano
- Freddy Freeman or Captain Marvel Jr., currently a DC Comics hero
- Fred Jones (Scooby-Doo), in the Scooby Doo series
- Freddy Krueger, a killer in the A Nightmare on Elm Street series and other films
- Freddie McClair, from generation 2 of Skins
- Freddy Newandyke, from the film Reservoir Dogs
- Freddy Riley, a survivor in the video game Identity V
- Freddie Roscoe, in the UK soap opera Hollyoaks
- Freddie "Boom Boom" Washington, in the television series Welcome Back, Kotter
- Freddy (weather), a cartoon weatherman in Hong Kong
- Freddy the Pig, in a series of children's books written by Walter R. Brooks
- Fat Freddy Freekowtski, one of the main Fabulous Furry Freak Brothers.

== See also ==
- Fredi (disambiguation)
- Fred (given name)
- Freddo
- Fredro
- Freddy (disambiguation)
