= Frederic =

Frederic may refer to:

== Places in the United States ==
- Frederic, Wisconsin, a village
- Frederic Township, Michigan, a township
  - Frederic, Michigan, an unincorporated community

== Other uses ==
- Frederic (band), a Japanese rock band
- Frederic (given name), including a list of people and characters with the name
- Hurricane Frederic, a hurricane that hit the U.S. Gulf Coast in 1979
- Sabina Frederic, Argentine social anthropologist
- Trent Frederic, American ice hockey player

== See also ==
- Frédéric
- Frederick (disambiguation)
- Fredrik
- Fryderyk (disambiguation)
