= Frederick =

Frederick or Frederik may refer to:

== People and fictional characters ==
- Frederick (given name), including a list of people and fictional characters named Frederick or Frederik
- Frederick of Utrecht (c. 780–834/838), saint and bishop of Utrecht
- Frederik (singer), (1945), stage name of Finnish singer Ilkka Juhani Sysimetsä
- Dave Frederick, American sportswriter and coach
- Sabrina Frederick (born 1996), Australian rules footballer

== Places ==
=== United States ===
- Frederick, Colorado, a town in Weld County
- Frederick, Kansas, a town
- Frederick County, Maryland
- Frederick, Maryland, a city in Frederick County
- Frederick, Michigan, a ghost town
- Frederick, Ohio, an unincorporated community
- Frederick, Oklahoma, a city in Tillman County
- Frederick, South Dakota, a town in Brown County
- Frederick County, Virginia
- Frederick Creek (disambiguation), several streams
- Frederick Sound, a sound in Alaska

=== Canada ===
- Frederick, Ontario
- Frederick Sound (Canada), a sound in British Columbia

== Arts and entertainment ==
- "Frederick" (song) by Patti Smith
- Frederick (book), a 1968 children's book by Leo Lionni

== Other uses ==
- Frederick (ship), several ships
- Frederick (horse), a racehorse

== See also ==
- Frederic (disambiguation)
- Frédéric
- Fredrik
- Frederico
- Federico
- Friedrich (disambiguation)
- Fryderyk (given name)
- Fredericks (surname)
- Georgii Frederiks
