= Priit =

Male given name

- Gender: Male
- Language: Estonian
- Name day: 5 September (Estonia)

Origin
- Region of origin: Estonia

Other names
- Related names: Priidu; Priidik; Preedik; Reedik

Priit is an Estonian masculine given name, cognate to English Fred or Frederick and to German Friedrich.

Notable people named Priit include:

- Priit Aavik (born 1994), swimmer
- Priit Aimla (1941–2026), writer, poet, humorist and politician
- Priit Herodes (born 1948), heraldist
- Priit Jaagant (1972–2025), business executive
- Priit Kasesalu (born 1972), programmer and software developer
- Priit Kolbre (1956–2006), diplomat
- Priit Kolsar (born 1976; better known as Cool D), rapper
- Priit Loog (born 1984), actor
- Priit Narusk (born 1977), cross-country skier
- Priit Pallum (born 1964), diplomat
- Priit Pärn (born 1946), cartoonist and animation director
- Priit Pedajas (born 1954), actor and theatre director
- Priit Pikamäe (born 1973), lawyer and President of the Supreme Court of Estonia
- Priit Pius (born 1989), actor
- Priit Pullerits (born 1965), journalist
- Priit Raik (1948–2008), composer, conductor and pedagogue
- Priit Raudkivi (1920–1970), actor
- Priit Raudkivi (historian) (born 1954), historian
- Priit Salumäe, cyclist
- Priit Sibul (born 1977), politician
- Priit Suit (1881–1942), politician
- Priit Suve (1901–1942), lawyer and politician
- Priit Tasane (born 1964), rower
- Priit Tender (born 1971), animated film director
- Priit Tomson (born 1942), basketball player
- Priit Toobal (born 1983), politician
- Priit Vesilind (1943–2023), writer and photojournalist
- Priit Viks (born 1982), biathlete
- Priit Vilba (born 1953), politician and businessman
- Priit Võigemast (born 1980), actor
- Priit Volmer (born 1978), opera singer

== See also ==
- Prii (surname)
