= Frederick of Lorraine =

Frederick of Lorraine may refer to:

- Frederick of Lorraine (cardinal), became the Pope as Stephen IX (1057-1058)
- Frederick I, Duke of Lorraine, (d. 1206)
- Frederick II, Duke of Lorraine, (d. 1213)
- Frederick III, Duke of Lorraine, (d. 1302)
- Frederick IV, Duke of Lorraine, (d. 1329)
- Frederick of Lorraine (Ferry de Lorraine), Bishop of Orléans (1297-1299)
- Frederick of Lorraine, Count of Vaudémont, French nobleman (b. 1371 - d. 1415)

== See also ==
- Frederick (disambiguation)
- Frederick (given name)
