= Frede =

Frede can be a given or surname.

== Mononym ==
- Frede (cabaret manager), French lesbian and cabaret manager (1914–1976)

== Given name ==
- Frede Blaabjerg, Danish professor (1940–)
- Frede Castberg, Norwegian jurist (1893–1977)
- Frede Hansen, Danish gymnast (1897–1979)
- Frede Jensen, Danish footballer (1919–1970)
- Frede Jensen (philologist) (1926–2008)
- Frede Johansen, Danish professional darts player (1969–)
- Frede Schött, Danish speedway rider (1970–)
- Frede Vidar (1911–1967), Danish-born American visual artist

== Surname ==
- Adele Frede, birth name of Danish silent film actress Valda Valkyrien (1895–1956)
- Eric Frede, American sportscaster
- Michael Frede, scholar of ancient philosophy (1940–2007)

== Other ==
- Frede, a demonym for the United States
- Slå først Frede! (Strike First Freddie), a 1965 film
- Slap af, Frede! (Relax Freddie), a 1966 film

== See also ==
- Fred (disambiguation)
- Phred (disambiguation)
