= Capece railway station =

Railway station in Capece, Italy

Capece

General information
- Location: Capece, Province of Brindisi, Apulia; Italy
- Coordinates: 40°35′09″N 17°33′59″E
- Owner: Rete Ferroviaria Italiana
- Operator: Ferrovie del Sud Est
- Line: Martina Franca-Lecce railway
- Platforms: 1
Location
- Location within Apulia Location within Southern Italy Location within Italy

Capece is a railway station in Capece, Italy. The station is located on the Martina Franca-Lecce railway. The train services are operated by Ferrovie del Sud Est.

== Train services ==
The station is served by the following service(s):

- Local services (Treno regionale) Martina Franca - Francavilla Fontana - Novoli - Lecce
