= Fredericks =

Fredericks may refer to:

- Fredericks (surname), a surname
- Fredericks Foundation, a British charity

== See also ==
- Frederick
- Frederick's
- Fredricks
