= Federico Bessone =

Federico Bessone may refer to:

- Federico Bessone (footballer, born 1972), Argentine football defender
- Federico Bessone (footballer, born 1984), Argentine football coach and former left-back
