= Friedrichs =

Friedrichs may refer to:

== Names ==
- Bob Friedrichs, American baseball pitcher
- Carl Joseph Friedrichs, German printer, author and gold prospector
- Friedrich Friedrichs, German World War I fighter ace
- Fritz Walter Paul Friedrichs, German chemist
- Hanns-Joachim Friedrichs, German journalist
- Helmuth Friedrichs, German Nazi Party official
- George Friedrichs, American sailor and Olympian
- Georgie Friedrichs, Australian rugby sevens player
- Kurt Otto Friedrichs, German American mathematician
- Paul A. Friedrichs, Director of Pandemic
- Paul Friedrichs, East German motocross racer
- Rebecca Friedrichs, lead plaintiff in the Friedrichs v. California Teachers Ass'n case

== Other uses ==
- Friedrichs v. California Teachers Association, a case before the Supreme Court of the United States

== See also ==
- Fredericks
- Friedrich
