= Frederick (given name) =

Male given name

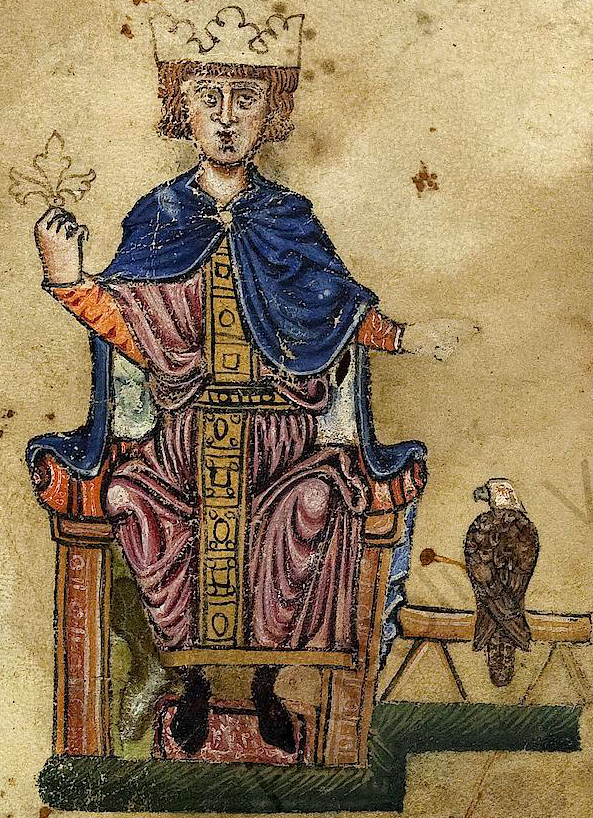
- Frederick II, Holy Roman Emperor and the Eagle
- Pronunciation: /ˈfrɛdərɪk/ FRED-ər-ik
- Gender: Male
- Name day: July 18

Origin
- Origin: Germanic
- Meaning: "peaceful ruler"

Other names
- Related names: Frid, Fritz, Rick, Ricky, Fred, Fedde, Freddy, Redd, Friedrich, Federico, Fredrik, Fadrique

Frederick is a male given name meaning "peace king" or "peaceful ruler". It is the English form of the German name Friedrich. Its meaning is derived from the Germanic word elements frid, or peace, and ric, meaning "king", "ruler", or "power".

Frederick ranked among the top 100 names in the United States between 1880 and 1957 and has declined thereafter. It was ranked as the 435th most popular name for boys in 2025 in that country. It ranked as the 52nd most popular name for boys in England and Wales in 2025, although Freddie, a short form, ranked in 10th place.

Frederica is a feminine variant of the name Frederick.

== Variants ==
- Afrikaans: Frederik
- Breton: Frederig
- Catalan: Frederic
- Croatian: Fridrik
- Czech: Bedřich, Bedříšek, Béda
- Danish: Frederik, Frede
- Dutch: Frederick, Frederik, Fred, Frits, Freek, Rik, Fedde
- Emiliano-Romagnolo: Fedrîgh
- English: Frederick, Fredrick, Fred, Freddy, Freddie, Frederic, Fredric
- Estonian: Priidu, Priit, Priidik, Preedik, Reedik
- Faroese: Fríðrikur
- Finnish: Fredrik, Veeti, Rieti, Reeti, Reetu
- French: Frédéric (Frédérique is the feminine variant)
- German: Friedrich, Fritz, Fredi, Fredy, Feick, Frierdich
- Greek: Φρειδερίκος (Freideríkos)
- Hungarian: Frigyes, Frici
- Icelandic: Friðrik
- Irish: Feardorcha
- Italian: Federico, Fredo, Federigo (obsolete)
- Latin: Fridericus
- Latvian: Frīdrihs, Fricis, Frīdis, Freds, Fredijs, Frederiks
- Lithuanian: Frederikas
- Norwegian: Fredrik
- Old Frisian: Frethirik
- Old Norse: Friðríkr
- Polish: Fryderyk, Fredek, Fryc
- Portuguese: Fradique, Frederico
- Romanian: Frederic
- Russian: Фридрих (Fridrih), Фредерик (Frederik)
- Scottish Gaelic: Freadaraig
- Serbian: Fridrih
- Slovene: Friderik
- Spanish: Federico, Fico, Feche, Fede, Fadrique (obsolete)
- Swedish: Fredrik
- Welsh: Ffredrig, Ffred

== Notable people with the name ==
=== Kings of Denmark ===
- Frederick I of Denmark (1471–1533)
- Frederick II of Denmark (1534–1588)
- Frederick III of Denmark (1609–1670)
- Frederick IV of Denmark (1671–1730)
- Frederick V of Denmark (1723–1766)
- Frederick VI of Denmark (1768–1839)
- Frederick VII of Denmark (1808–1863)
- Frederick VIII of Denmark (1843–1912)
- Frederik IX of Denmark (1899–1972)
- Frederik X of Denmark (born 1968)

=== Kings of Prussia ===
- Frederick the Great (Frederick II of Prussia, 1712–1786)
- Frederick I of Prussia (1657–1713), previously Frederick III, Elector of Brandenburg
- Frederick III, German Emperor (1831–1888), also King Frederick III of Prussia
- Frederick William I of Prussia (1688–1740)
- Frederick William II of Prussia (1744–1797)
- Frederick William III of Prussia (1770–1840)
- Frederick William IV (1795–1861)

=== Kings and electors of Saxony ===
- Frederick III, Elector of Saxony (1463–1525), known as Frederick the Wise
- Frederick Augustus I of Saxony (1750–1827), Elector and King of Saxony
- Frederick Augustus II of Saxony (1797–1854), King of Saxony
- Frederick Augustus III of Saxony (1865–1932), King of Saxony

=== King of Sweden ===
- Frederick I of Sweden (1676–1751)

=== King of Württemberg ===
- Frederick I of Württemberg (1754–1816)

=== Holy Roman Emperors ===
- Frederick I, Holy Roman Emperor (1122–1190) (Barbarossa)
- Frederick II, Holy Roman Emperor (1194–1250)
- Frederick III, Holy Roman Emperor (1415–1493)

=== Electors Palatine ===
- Frederick IV, Elector Palatine (1574–1610)
- Frederick V of the Palatinate (1596–1632), also King Frederick I of Bohemia

=== Other nobility ===
- Frederick of Naples (1452–1504), King of Naples
- Prince Frederick (disambiguation)
- Frederick I, Duke of Austria (Babenberg), Duke of Austria from 1195 to 1198
- Frederick II, Duke of Austria (1219–1246), last Duke of Austria from the Babenberg dynasty
- Frederick the Fair (Frederick I of Austria (Habsburg), 1286–1330), Duke of Austria and King of the Romans
- Frederick I, Grand Duke of Baden (1826–1907), Grand Duke of Baden
- Frederick II, Grand Duke of Baden (1857–1928), Grand Duke of Baden
- Frederick, Duke of Bohemia (died 1189), Duke of Olomouc and Bohemia
- Frederick I, Duke of Anhalt (1831–1904)
- Frederick II Eugene, Duke of Württemberg (1732–1797)
- Frederick III, Duke of Holstein-Gottorp (1597–1659)
- Frederick IV, Duke of Holstein-Gottorp (1671–1702)
- Frederick William, the Great Elector (1620–1688), Duke of Prussia
- Frederick VIII, Duke of Schleswig-Holstein (1829–1880)
- Frederick William, Duke of Schleswig-Holstein-Sonderburg-Glücksburg (1785–1831)
- Frederick I, Elector of Brandenburg (1371–1440), also known as Frederick VI, Burgrave of Nuremberg
- Frederick II, Elector of Brandenburg (1413–1470), Margrave of Brandenburg
- Frederick II, Landgrave of Hesse-Homburg (1585–1638)
- Frederick II, Landgrave of Hesse-Kassel (1720–1785)
- Frederick I, Margrave of Brandenburg-Ansbach (1460–1536)
- Frederick III, Burgrave of Nuremberg (c. 1220–1297)
- Frederick IV, Burgrave of Nuremberg (1287–1332)
- Frederick V, Burgrave of Nuremberg (died 1398)

== Others ==
- Frederick, full name of Freddy, German soccer fan and social media personality
- Frederick of Utrecht (c. 780–834/838), saint, bishop of Utrecht
- Fred Akuffo (1937–1979), Ghanaian army officer, Head of State of Ghana from July 1978 to June 1979
- Frederick Austerlitz, birth name of Fred Astaire (1899–1987), American dancer, actor, musician, and singer
- Frederick Avery, birth name of Tex Avery (1908–1980), American animator
- Frederick Banting (1891–1941), Canadian doctor who co-discovered insulin
- Frederick Benteen (1834-1898), American military officer
- Frederick Cronyn Betts, Canadian politician and solicitor
- Freddie Blassie, American professional wrestling villain and manager
- Frederick C. Bock, American World War II pilot
- Fred Bodsworth, Canadian writer, journalist and amateur naturalist
- Frederick Russell Burnham, American scout and world-traveling adventurer
- Frederick Bywaters (1902–1923), English murderer
- Frederick Carrington, British military leader
- Frederick William Chapman (1806–1876), American Congregational minister, educator, and genealogist
- Frederick Chatard (1807–1897), American naval officer
- Frédéric Chopin, Polish composer
- Fredrick de Silva (1912–1993), Sri Lankan lawyer and ambassador to France and UNESCO
- Fred Dibnah (1938–2004), English steeplejack and television personality
- Frederick Douglass (1818–1895), African-American social reformer, abolitionist, orator, writer, and statesman
- Frederick T. Ernst (1922–2020), American politician
- Frederick Augustus Forbes (1818–1878), Australian politician
- Frederick Forsyth (1938–2025), British writer and journalist
- Freddy Stephen Fuller, Canadian ex-amateur boxer
- Frederick Graff (1775–1847), American hydraulic engineer
- Freddie Gibbs, American rapper
- Frederick Gillespie (born 1997), American basketball player in the Israeli Basketball Premier League
- Frederick D. Gregory, former United States Air Force pilot, military engineer, test pilot, and NASA astronaut as well as former NASA Deputy Administrator
- Frederick Gutekunst (1831–1917), American photographer
- Frederick Halterman (1831–1907), U.S. Congressman
- Frederick Hatch (disambiguation)
- Frederick Hauck (1941–2025), captain in the United States Navy, fighter pilot and NASA astronaut
- Frederick Mitchell Hodgson, British colonial administrator who was Governor of the Gold Coast (1898–1900), Barbados (1900–04) and British Guiana (1904–11)
- Fred Hollows (1929–1993), Australian ophthalmologist and philanthropist
- Frederick Howard, 5th Earl of Carlisle, British peer, statesman, diplomat, and author
- Frederic Lang, New Zealand politician, the eighth Speaker of the House of Representatives from 1913 to 1922
- Frederick W. Leslie, American scientist and astronaut
- Frederick Pei Li (1940–2015), American physician and co-discoverer of Li-Fraumeni syndrome
- Frederick W. Loew (1834–1909), French-American lawyer and judge
- Frederik Magle (born 1977), Danish composer
- Frederick Marple (1871–1931), English footballer
- Frederick McAlpine, Bahamian politician
- Fredrick Moore (born 2005), American football player
- Fredrick Muyia Nafukho, Kenyan-American academic
- Frederick Norris (1921–2006), British marathon runner
- Frederick North, Lord North, Prime Minister of Great Britain
- Frederick Law Olmsted, American landscape architect, journalist, social critic, and public administrator
- Frederick C. Olney (1862–1918), African-American lawyer
- Frederick Alfred Pile, British army officer
- Frederick Poole, English army officer and general
- Frederik Raben-Levetzau (1850–1933), Danish count and politician
- Frederick Roberts (British Army officer, born 1872), British Army officer
- F. J. Robinson, 1st Viscount Goderich, British politician and prime minister of the United Kingdom
- Frederick de la Roche (died 1173), sixth Latin archbishop of Tyre
- Frederik Rønnow (born 1992), Danish footballer
- Frederick Sandys, British painter, illustrator, and draughtsman
- Frederick Sanger, British biochemist who twice won the Nobel Prize in Chemistry
- Fredrick de Saram (1912–1983), Sri Lankan Sinhala army colonel, lawyer, and cricket captain
- Frederick Scherger, British Air Chief Marshal
- Frederik Schmidt (1771–1840), Norwegian politician
- Frederik Pind Schmidt (born 1996), stage name Pind, Danish rapper, record producer, and songwriter
- Frederik Schou-Nielsen (born 1996), Danish sprinter
- Frederick Segura (born 1979), Venezuelan track and road cyclist
- Frederick Sheide (1876–1944), American politician
- Fredrick Twiindileni Shitana (born 1985), Namibian politician
- Frederick Moore Simpson (1855–1928), English architect, architectural historian and professor
- Frederick Skiff (1867–1947), American author, collector and bibliophile
- Fred "Sonic" Smith (1949–1994), guitarist of American rock band MC5
- Frederick W. Sturckow, engineer, retired United States Marine Corps officer, former NASA astronaut, and commercial spacecraft pilot
- Frederick Sturrock (1882–1958), South African politician
- Frederik Svane (born 2004), German chess grandmaster
- Frederick Swann (1931–2022), American organist and choral conductor
- Frederic Thesiger, 1st Baron Chelmsford, British jurist and Conservative politician, twice Lord Chancellor of Great Britain
- Frederic Thesiger, 1st Viscount Chelmsford, British statesman, Governor of Queensland from 1905 to 1909, Governor of New South Wales from 1909 to 1913, Viceroy of India from 1916 to 1921
- Frederic Thesiger, 2nd Baron Chelmsford, British imperial general who came to prominence during the Anglo-Zulu War
- Frederick Varley (1881–1969), painter
- Frederick Wiseman (1930–2026), American film director

== Fictional characters ==
- Frederick (Animal Farm), the owner of Pinchfield Farm in the novel by George Orwell
- Emperor Frederick, the evil emperor in the Dune II game
- Frederick Gaylord Crane, fictional child of Lilith and Frasier Crane on the American TV shows Cheers and Frasier
- Frederick Kreiburg, a survivor in the video game Identity V
- Fredrick Zoller, from the film Inglourious Basterds

== See also ==
- Frederic (given name)
- Frederica (given name)
