= Fritz (disambiguation) =

Fritz is both a surname and a given name.

Fritz may also refer to:

== Places ==
- Fritz, Kentucky, an unincorporated community within Magoffin County, Kentucky, United States
- A Pedra do Fritz, a high peak in the Serra dos Aimorés mountains in Brazil

== Business ==
- Fritz-chip, secure cryptoprocessor of the Trusted Computing Group
- Fritz!, German computer networking hardware company
- "Fritz" helmet, nickname for the Personnel Armor System for Ground Troops kevlar helmet currently used by the US Military
- Fritz, alternate name for Devon sausage
- Fritz handle, cane handle developed by a German count to make cane use by the arthritic sufferer more comfortable

== Others ==
- Fritz (chess), a computer chess program
- Fritz, a short story by Satyajit Ray
- Nickname to the German given name Friedrich (given name)
- Alias of Friedrich Oskar Giesel
- Walter Mondale, nicknamed Fritz, former vice president of the United States]]

== See also ==
- Fritz X, a guided bomb, developed during World War II
- "On the fritz", phrase meaning an appliance is broken or malfunctioning (imitating the sound of electric sparks)
- Frit, a ceramic composition
