= Vicke Schorler =

German merchant (c. 1560–1625)

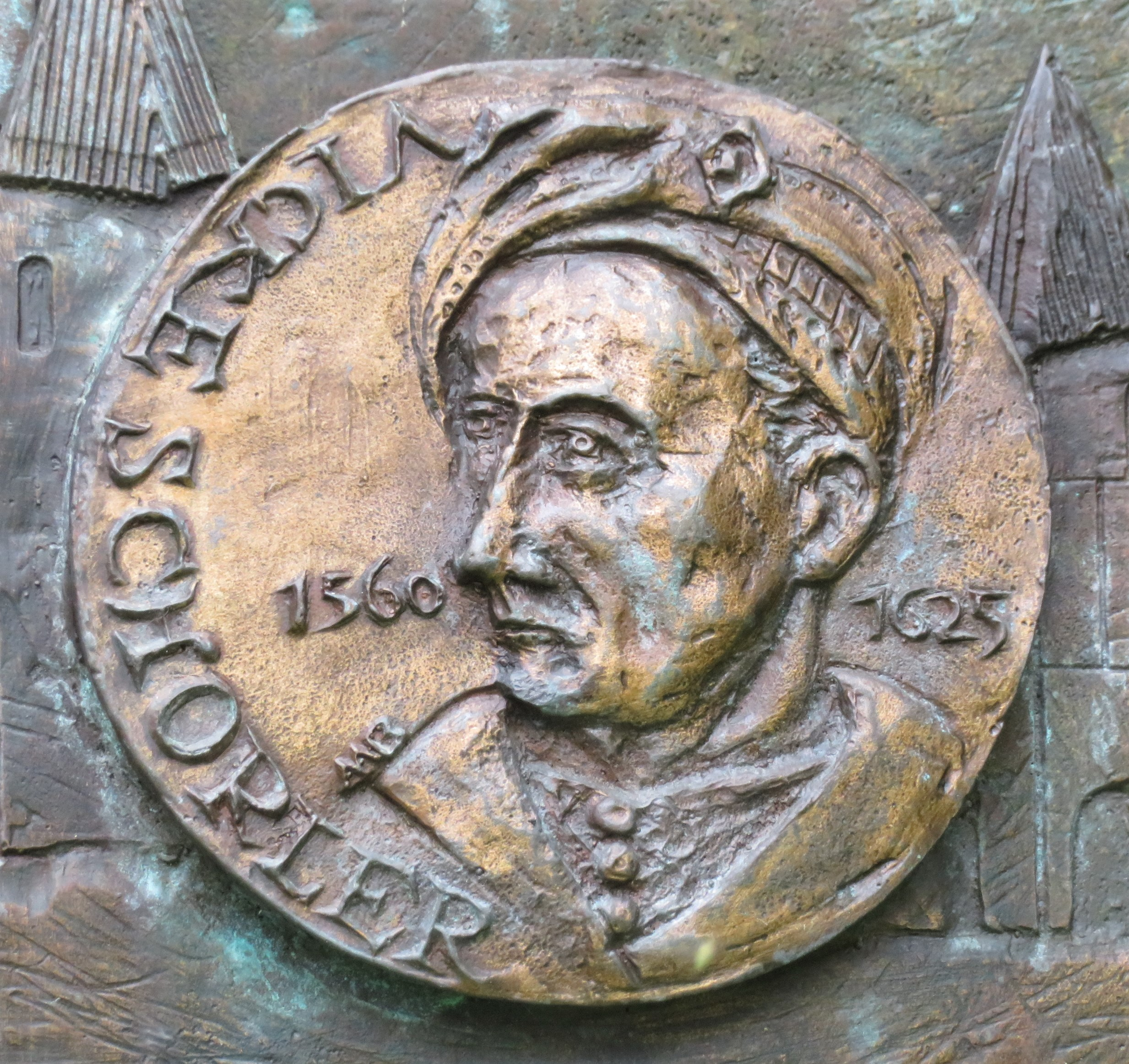
Vicke Schorler, fictitious portrait on the Jastram relief in 2006

Vicke Schorler (c. 1560–1625) was a grocer in the German Hanseatic city of Rostock. He created two historically significant works about the city: the "Vicke Schorler scroll", a monumental drawing with the title Wahrhaftige Abcontrafactur der hochloblichen und weitberuhmten alten See- und Hensestadt Rostock (approximately True depiction of the highly praiseworthy and widely famous old sea port and Hanseatic city of Rostock) (1578–1586), and the Rostock Chronicle (1583–1625).

== Sources ==
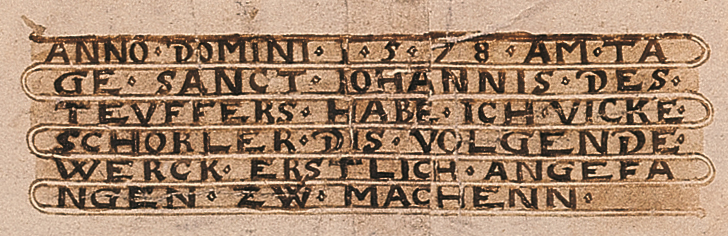
Initial note on the Vicke- Schorler role

Despite the extensive historical record, Vicke Schorler preserved of Rostock during his time, little is known about his life. For example, his authorship of the anonymous Rostock Chronicle was discovered by chance. He left his name only on the Vicke Schorler Scroll, which was later named after him. No evidence suggests that he created the Rostock Chronicle or the scroll as commissioned works. His work was therefore likely based on a personal interest in his hometown.

== Life and work ==
=== Origin ===
Vicke, a common diminutive for Friedrich in Low German, was the name by which Schorler identified himself. His birthplace is likely Rostock, though this is not certain. He had a brother, the merchant Hans Schorler, and an unnamed sister. As the brothers were initially not wealthy, records suggest they both married widows and moved into their homes. Vicke Schorler acquired citizenship on 11 January 1589 as a journeyman grocer. He became self-employed, married, and joined the Krämerkompanie on 3 February 1589, indicating he had sufficient financial means at that time. The entrance fee for this company included an official fee of 50 guilders and a chapel fee of 3 guilders. A 1589 source indicates that Schorler lived in a house on Am Schilde, previously owned by Marten Randow of Beutler. Randow's widow, Margarete Schmidt, transferred the house to Schorler on 4 July 1590, suggesting their marriage occurred in 1589. Margarete Schmidt's prior marriage to Randow was brief, as his previous wife, Anna, died in 1582. Nevertheless, she brought two children from that marriage, making Vicke Schorler a stepfather. Schorler himself had at least two children, a daughter, and a son.

Schorler's wife was the daughter of a furrier, or master furrier, specialising in precious skins, who owned a house in Blutstraße, now part of Kröpeliner Straße between Neuer Markt and Universitätsplatz. She later inherited this house, which was transferred to Schorler as her legal guardian.

Schorler likely served as a member of Rostock's Hundred Men College until his death, holding a significant political office in addition to his role as an elder of the Landfahrer-Krämerkompanie zur Heiligen Dreifaltigkeit. The goods he traded were not documented. As one of Rostock's wealthiest shopkeepers, he was probably a silk, spice, or iron merchant, as these trades were highly valued. The final entry in Schorler's Rostock Chronicle is dated February 1625, three months after his wife's death. Tax lists from 1626 note him as deceased.

=== Family ===
Schorler's son, likely named Franz after his father-in-law, was a shopkeeper like his father. He was enrolled in the shopkeepers' company on 4 April 1616 and acquired citizenship on 1 February 1617. On 4 April 1617, Schorler transferred the house on Am Schilde to his son, with the condition that the cellar was reserved for him and his wife as a permanent dwelling. Around the same time, he sold the house in Blutstraße to Hans Klein, Schorler's son-in-law, the elder of the goldsmiths' council, and later mint master of Rostock. Shortly thereafter, Hans Klein and Franz Schorler exchanged the houses. Vicke Schorler remained in the house on Am Schilde until his death.

Schorler's son died within a year of his father's death. In 1624, he sold the house again, likely due to financial difficulties, as he left behind children, a widow, and debts. Vicke Schorler's daughter also died soon after, as evidenced by Hans Klein's marriage to the widow Anna Fickers in 1632. Hans Klein later gained renown for creating the great seal of Charles II of England in the service of the English king. Schorler's brother, likely of similar age, died between 1600 and 1603, aged about 38. He married a widow who brought five children into the marriage and had two children with her. The brothers also had a sister who lived in Rostock.

Schorler's family reveals much about the typical family structure in Rostock at the time. They lived in middle-class conditions shaped by care, maintenance, and financial and legal security. Family structures were influenced by high mortality rates among women and children, resulting in many orphans, half-orphans, and widows. Citizens were rarely married only once.

== The picture roll of Vicke Schorler ==
The coloured pen-and-ink drawing, measuring 18.68 metres by 60 centimetres, is entitled True Abcontrafactur of the Highly Praiseworthy and Widely Famous Old Lake and the Hanse City of Rostock – Capital of the Land of Mecklenburg. Here, "capital" refers to the most important and largest city in the region, as reflected in the drawing's composition. Rostock occupies the centre, dominating most of the scroll. On the outskirts are church villages, including Kessin, Schwaan, and the larger princely residence of Güstrow, the earliest known illustration of which appears on the Vicke Schorler Scroll. Warnemünde is depicted in a bird's-eye view. The scroll depicts significant buildings, roads, trade routes, ships, and people, such as merchants and students, engaged in their activities. Schorler worked on the drawing for eight years, completing it in 1586, as inscribed: "Anno Domini 1586, on the day of St. John the Baptist, I, Vicke Schorler, have completed the aforesaid work entirely and completely".

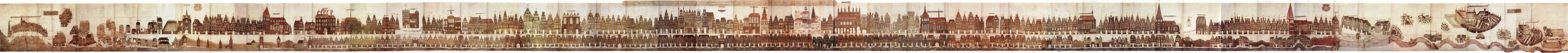
Vicke Schorler: "True account of the highly praised and famous old maritime and Hanseatic city of Rostock - the capital of the Meckelnburg region"

=== Reception ===
Through the Vicke Schorler Scroll, Vicke Schorler created a unique cultural-historical record of both the Hanseatic city of Rostock and Hanseatic culture. The scroll showcases architecture from the peak of the Gothic period alongside early Renaissance influences. This highly detailed depiction presents Rostock in its full Hanseatic prosperity. The perspective blends veduta and bird's-eye view, reflecting contemporary tastes. The scroll's depiction of Rostock's architecture before the 1677 fire, which destroyed much of the city, holds significant cultural-historical value.

Some buildings reconstructed after the Second World War, such as one in Wokrenterstraße, were designed based on the Vicke Schorler Scroll or influenced by its depiction, as seen in the five-gable house.

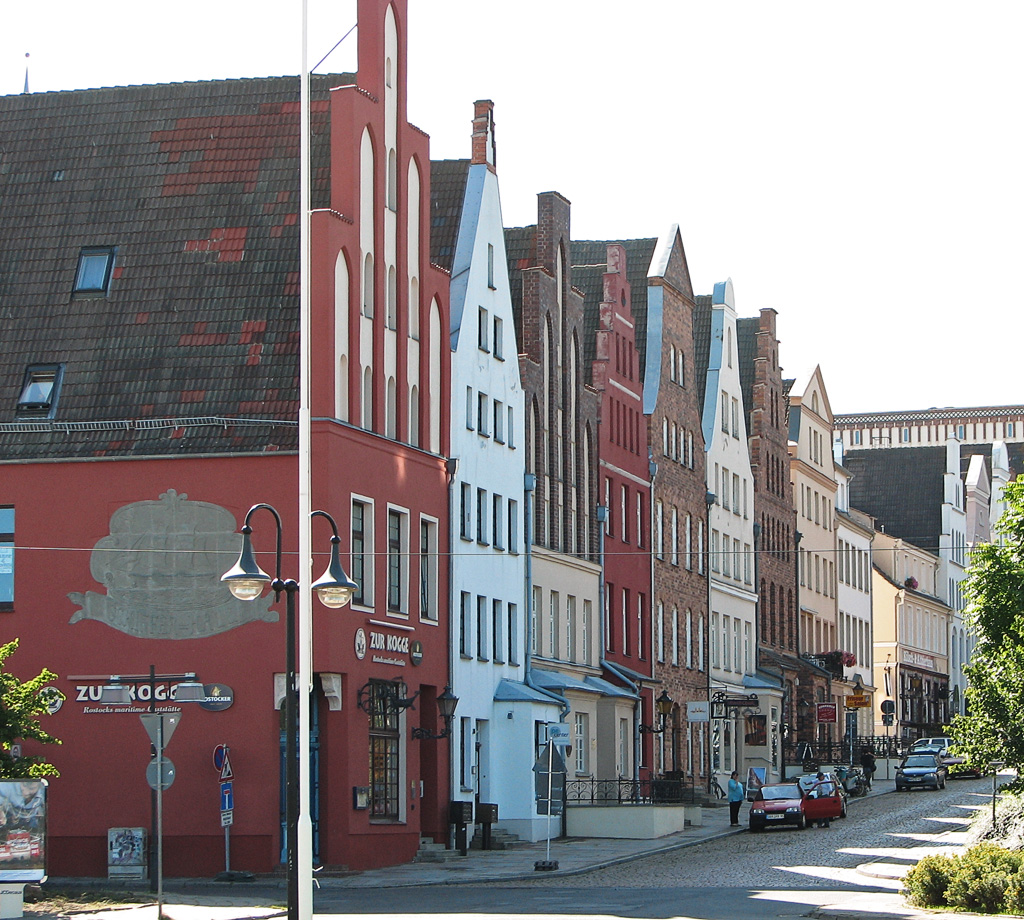
The Wokrenterstraße in Rostock with its historic gables

In memory of Schorler and the scroll, in 2006, Jo Jastram designed a bronze relief stylising part of the scroll, which was attached to a façade at Glatter Aal in Rostock.

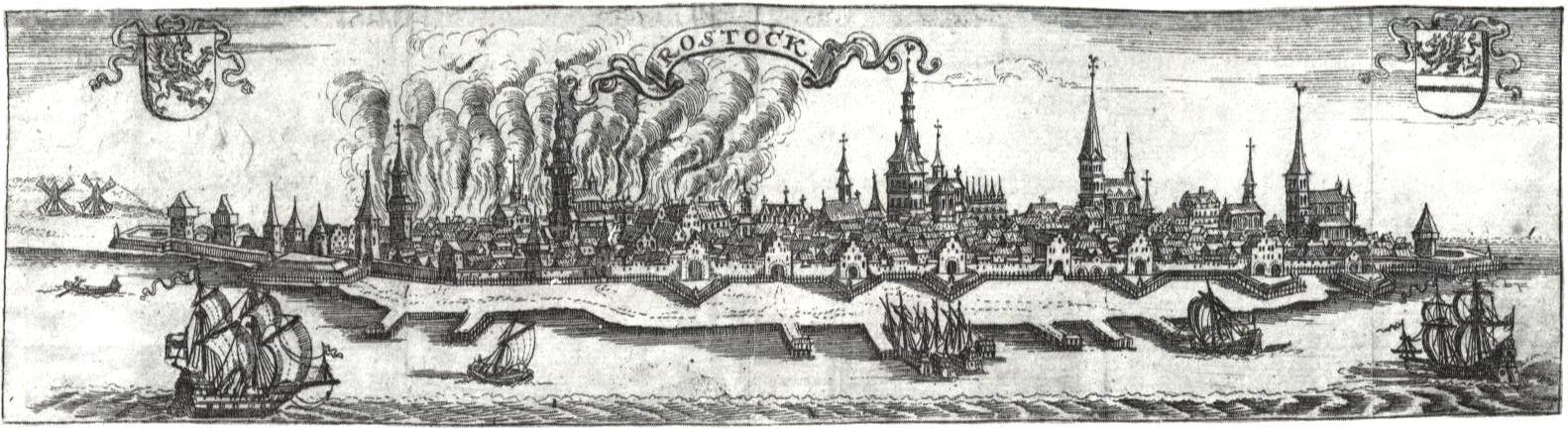
Depiction of the great fire of Rostock in 1677

=== Prehistory ===
Artists such as Albrecht Dürer helped establish the city as an independent motif for painters and graphic artists in realistic depictions. Hartmann Schedel's world chronicle, Liber Chronicarum, published in 1493 in Latin and German editions, significantly contributed to this development. It included over 1,800 woodcuts by Wilhelm Pleydenwurff and Michael Wohlgemut, Dürer's teacher. Of these, 116 bore place names, and 30 depicted realistic views. In the 15th and 16th centuries, humanist scholars primarily promoted the publication of these widely popular depictions in book format.

Hans Weigel's cityscape, a woodcut titled Wahrhafftige Contrafactur der alten herrlichen Stat Rostock, created circa 1550–1560, likely served as a direct model for the Vicke Schorler Scroll. The title closely resembles Schorler's, and the accuracy of its depiction of gates, churches, and houses is comparable to Vicke Schorler's.

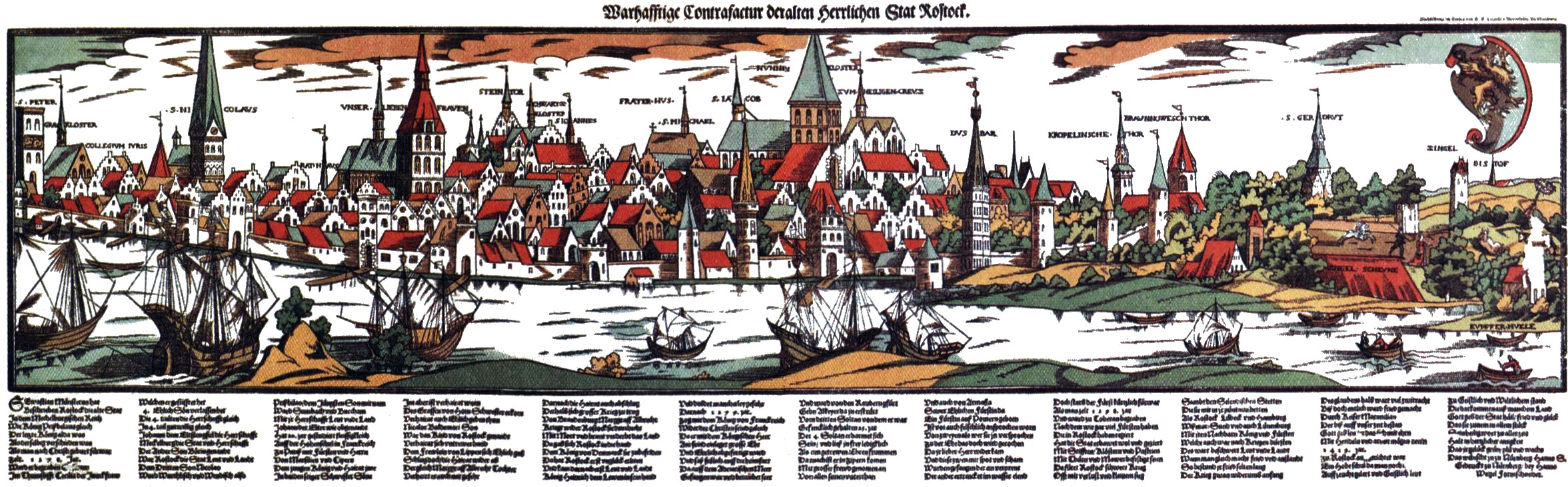
Hans Weigel: Wahrhafftige Contrafactur der alten herrlichen Stat Rostock (with verses by Hans Sachs)

== The Rostock Chronicle of Vicke Schorler ==
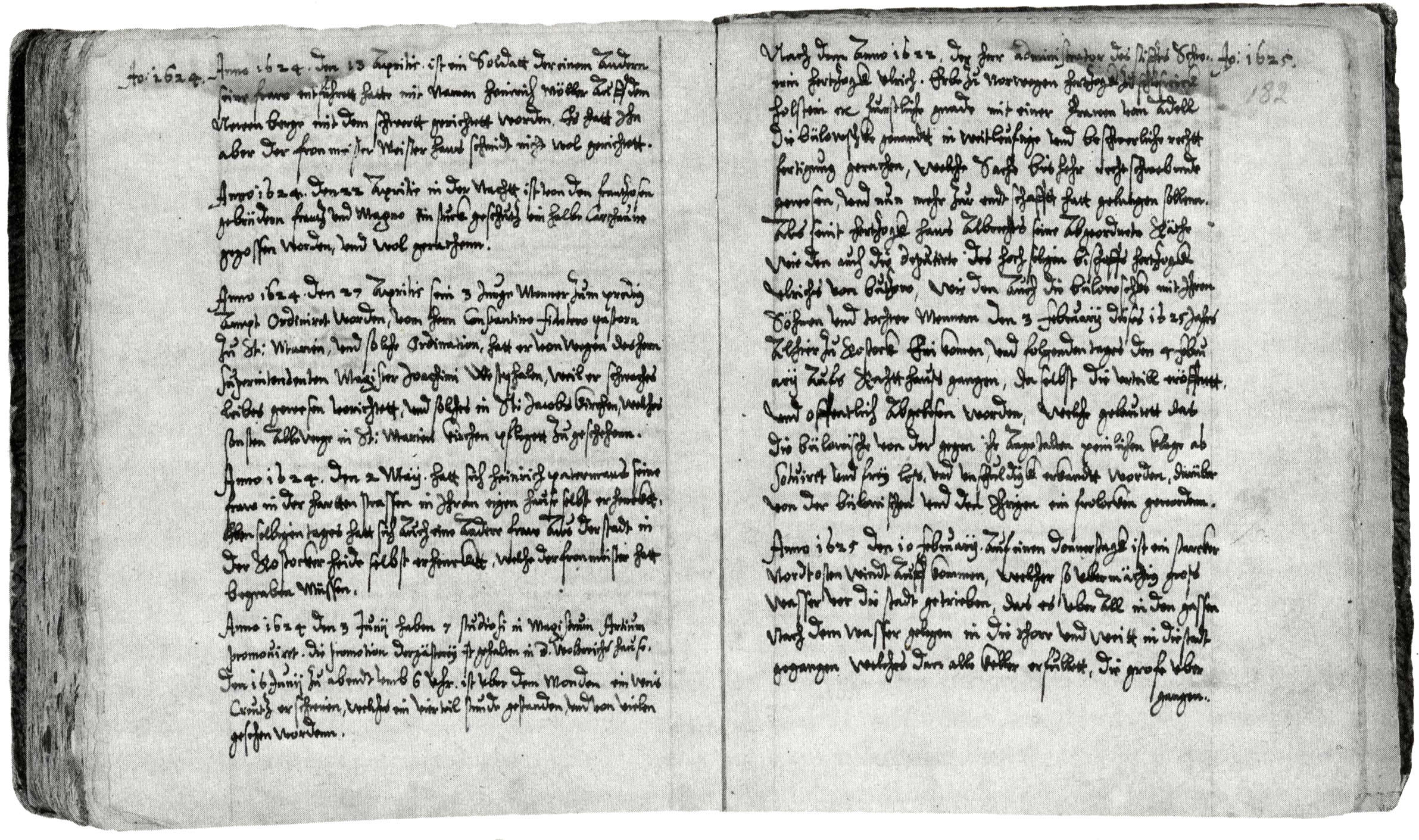
Schorlers Rostocker Chronik

Vicke Schorler authored a Rostock Chronicle, continuing the chronicle of bookbinder Dietrich vam Lohe and covering 1583 to 1625. The author's identity remained unknown for years until city archivist Ernst Dragendorff (1869–1938) meticulously compared typefaces, clearly identifying Schorler. The chronicle records incidents like storms and fires, as well as weddings, economic, political, and cultural events, Frau von Bülow's struggles for her rights, and suspicions of witchcraft against Mrs. Thamar. It serves as a vital record of daily life in Rostock during this period.

Schorler's chronicle is housed in a grey-black quarto book. His precise working method is evident: exact lines, thin pencil-and-ruler guidelines, a nearly consistent margin, few deletions, and consistent writing, ink, and quill throughout the text.

Before his chronicle, Schorler copied vam Lohe's chronicle, adding marginal remarks in the original. Unlike vam Lohe's Low German text, Schorler wrote in High German, reflecting a generation open to linguistic changes. He also included details that Lohe often omitted, a focus evident in the Vicke Schorler Scroll, where he depicted individual bricks, inscriptions, and images of houses. However, Schorler avoids subjective judgments, resembling vam Lohe in his objectivity. This truthfulness is emphasised in the title of the Vicke Schorler Scroll. Some subjectivity appears in his choice of events, such as the Wiker feast, an annual bird-shooting event of his shopkeepers' company. His final entries highlight Rostock's misfortunes: the 1624 plague epidemic fills two pages with names of the dead, though not exhaustively. On 10 February 1625, he details a storm surge that flooded cellars and pushed ships to the city wall. His death is unrecorded in any chronicle. The chronicles of Schorler and vam Lohe are distinctive, as regular chronicle-keeping in Rostock began only in the mid-16th century, later than in other Hanseatic cities, resulting in lost information. Written by non-professional writers, they contrast with later scholarly chronicles by theologians like Lucas Bacmeister, David Chyträus, Thomas Lindemann, Nikolaus Gryse, and Peter Lindenberg.
