= Bongioanni =

Bongioanni is an Italian surname. Notable people with the surname include:

- Angelo Bongioanni (1864–1931), Italian librarian and onomastician
- Federico Bongioanni (born 1978), Argentine footballer
- Gianni Bongioanni (1921–2018), Italian film director, screenwriter, cinematographer, camera operator, editor, writer, and actor

== See also ==
- Bongiovanni (surname)
