= Frédéric =

- Pronunciation: French: [fʁedeʁik]
- Gender: Male

Origin
- Meaning: Frederick
- Region of origin: France, Francophonie

Other names
- Related names: Frederic, Frederick, Friedrich, Fritz

Frédéric and Frédérick are the French versions of the common male given name Frederick.

== People with the given name ==
=== In artistry ===
- Frédéric Back, Canadian award-winning animator
- Frédéric Bartholdi, French sculptor
- Frédéric Bazille, Impressionist painter best known for his depiction of figures
- Frédéric Mariotti, actor

=== In politics ===
- Frédéric Bamvuginyumvira, 1st Vice-President of Burundi
- Frédéric Ngenzebuhoro, Vice-President of Burundi from 11 November 2004 to 26 August 2005
- Frédéric Bastiat, political economist and member of the French assembly
- Frédéric Dutoit (born 1956), French politician
- Frédéric Laplante, Canadian politician from Quebec
- Frédéric Mathieu (born 1977), French politician
- Frédéric Poulin, Canadian politician from Quebec

=== In literature ===
- Frédéric Beigbeder, French writer, commentator critic and pundit
- Frédéric Berat, French poet and songwriter
- Frédéric Mistral, French poet

=== In science ===
- Frédéric Cailliaud, French mineralogist
- Frédéric Joliot-Curie, French physicist and Nobel laureate

=== In sports ===
- Frédéric Bourdillon (born 1991), French-Israeli basketball player in the Israel Basketball Premier League
- Frédérick Bousquet (born 1981), French swimmer
- Frédéric Costes, (born 1957), French former rugby union international
- Frédéric Dagée, French shot putter
- Frédéric Delcourt, French swimmer
- Frédéric Demontfaucon, French judoka
- Frédéric Fauthoux (born 1972), French basketball coach
- Frédéric Havas, French volleyball player
- Frédéric Herpoel, Belgian footballer
- Frédéric Julan, French boxer
- Frédéric Kanouté, French-Malian footballer
- Frédéric Kuhn (born 1968), French hammer thrower
- Frédéric Michalak, French rugby union player
- Frédéric Piquionne, French footballer
- Frédéric Serrat, French boxer
- Frédéric Vasseur, French motorsport executive

=== In music ===
- Frédéric Chopin, Polish composer
- Frédéric Leclercq, the bassist for extreme power metal band DragonForce

=== Other fields ===
- Frédéric Dumas, French writer; one of the first two diving companions of Jacques-Yves Cousteau
- Frédérick Lemaître (born Antoine Louis Prosper Lemaître), French actor and playwright
- Frédéric Lepied, French computer engineer
- Frédéric Monod, French Protestant pastor
- Frédéric Nérac (born 1960), French journalist missing since 2003
- Frédéric Ozanam, French scholar
- Frédéric Passy, French economist
- Frédérick Raynal, French videogame designer and programmer
- Frédéric Rossif, French film and television director

== See also ==
- Federico
- Fred (disambiguation)
- Freddie (disambiguation)
- Freddo
- Freddy (disambiguation)
- Frederic (given name)
- Frederick (given name)
- Frederico
- Fredrik
- Fredro
- Friedrich (disambiguation)
- Fryderyk (disambiguation)
