= Thomas Frederick =

Thomas Frederick may refer to:

- Sir Thomas Frederick, 3rd Baronet (1731–1770), of the Frederick baronets
- Thomas Frederick (MP) (1707–1740), MP for New Shoreham (UK Parliament constituency)
- Thomas Frederick (Royal Navy officer) (1750–1799), British naval officer

== See also ==
- Frederick (disambiguation)
