= Frīdrihs =

Male given name

- Gender: Male
- Name day: 14 November

Origin
- Region of origin: Latvia

Other names
- Related names: Fricis

Frīdrihs, or Fridrihs, is a Latvian masculine given name. It is a cognate of the names Friedrich and Frederick. A diminutive form of Frīdrihs is Fricis. Individuals bearing the name Frīdrihs include:

- Jānis Frīdrihs Baumanis (1834–1891), Latvian architect
- Fridrihs Bošs (1887–1950), Latvian cyclist
- Frīdrihs Briedis (1888–1918), Latvian-Russian Empire Army colonel
- Frīdrihs Canders (also known as Friedrich Zander, 1887–1933), Baltic German pioneer of rocketry and spaceflight
- Fridrihs Ukstiņš (1895–19??), Latvian cyclist
- Frīdrihs Vesmanis (1875–1941), Latvian lawyer and politician
