= Bongiovanni (surname) =

Bongiovanni is an Italian surname. Notable people with the surname include:

- Adrien Bongiovanni (born 1999), Belgian footballer
- Berardo Bongiovanni (died 1574), Roman Catholic prelate, Bishop of Camerino and Apostolic Nuncio to Poland
- Giorgio Bongiovanni (born 1926), Italian basketball player
- Horacio Bongiovanni (born 1950), Argentine footballer
- Lidia Bongiovanni (1914–1998), Italian athlete
- Luigi Bongiovanni (1866–1941), Italian general
- Nino Bongiovanni (1911–2009), baseball player and manager
- Quinzio Bongiovanni (1550–1612), Italian doctor and scholar

== See also ==
- Bongiovanni (disambiguation)
- Bongioanni
