= Frederick (ship) =

Several ships have been named Frederick:

- Frederick (1803 ship), of 450 tons (bm), was built by Aberdeen & Hamilton in 1803 at Tittaghur in 1803. She had then been sold to Arabs. The French corvette Iéna captured her in 1808 in the Bay of Bengal, but HMS Modeste recaptured her.
- Frederick (1805 ship) was built in America but the British captured her circa 1805. She made two voyages as a slave ship in 1806-7, and then later made several voyages as a whaler.
- Frederick (1807 ship) was launched in 1807 at Chittagong. She was wrecked in 1818.
- Frederick (German ship), German sailing, wrecked in 1876.

== See also ==
- Frederick and Maria, a vessel launched at Chittagong in 1810 that foundered in the Indian Ocean in 1817.
