= Bongiovanni =

Bongiovanni may refer to

- Bongiovanni (surname)
- asteroid 20590 Bongiovanni
- Bongiovanni (record label), Bologna, Italy
- Bongiovanni da Recanati (died 1460), Roman Catholic prelate who served as Archbishop of Dubrovnik
