= Frederick Creek =

Frederick Creek may refer to:

- Frederick Creek (Minnesota), a stream in Minnesota
- Frederick Creek (Missouri), a stream in Missouri
