= Capece =

Capece is an Italian surname. Notable people with the surname include:

- Antonio Capece Minutolo (1768–1838), Italian nobleman, writer, diplomat and statesman
- Bill Capece (born 1959), American football player
- Corrado Capece (died 1482), Italian Roman Catholic prelate, Archbishop of Benevento
- Carlo Sigismondo Capece (1652–1728), Italian dramatist and librettist
- Federico Capece (born 1976), Argentine footballer
- Giorgio Capece (born 1992), Italian footballer
- Giuseppe Capece Zurlo (1711–1801), Italian cardinal
- Irma Capece Minutolo (1935–2023), Italian opera singer
- Ottaviano Capece (died 1616), Italian Roman Catholic prelate, Bishop of Nicotera
