= Phred =

Phred may refer to:

- Phred (software), a computer program used in molecular biology
- Phred quality score, a term used in molecular biology
- Phred (Doonesbury), a character from the comic strip Doonesbury
- Phred on Your Head Show, a children's television show
- The URL with Phred Show, a spin-off of the above

== See also ==
- Fred (disambiguation)
