= Frederico =

Frederico is a male given name. It is a form of Frederick, most commonly found in Portuguese.

== Literature ==
- Frederico Barbosa, Brazilian poet
- Frederico Ghisliero, Italian fencer and soldier who wrote his text Regole di molte cavagliereschi essercitii

== Sports ==
- Frederico Gil, Portuguese tennis player
- Frederico Morais, Portuguese surfer
- Frederico Chaves Guedes, Brazilian footballer
- Frederico Rodrigues Santos, Brazilian footballer
- Frederico Rosa, Portuguese footballer
- Frederico Ferreira Silva, Portuguese tennis player
- Helbert Frederico Carreiro da Silva, Brazilian footballer
- Paulo Frederico Benevenute, Brazilian footballer

== See also ==
- Federico
- Fred (disambiguation)
- Freddie (disambiguation)
- Freddo
- Freddy (disambiguation)
- Frédéric
- Frederick (given name)
- Fredrik
- Fredro
- Friedrich (disambiguation)
- Fryderyk (disambiguation)
