= Friedrich (given name) =

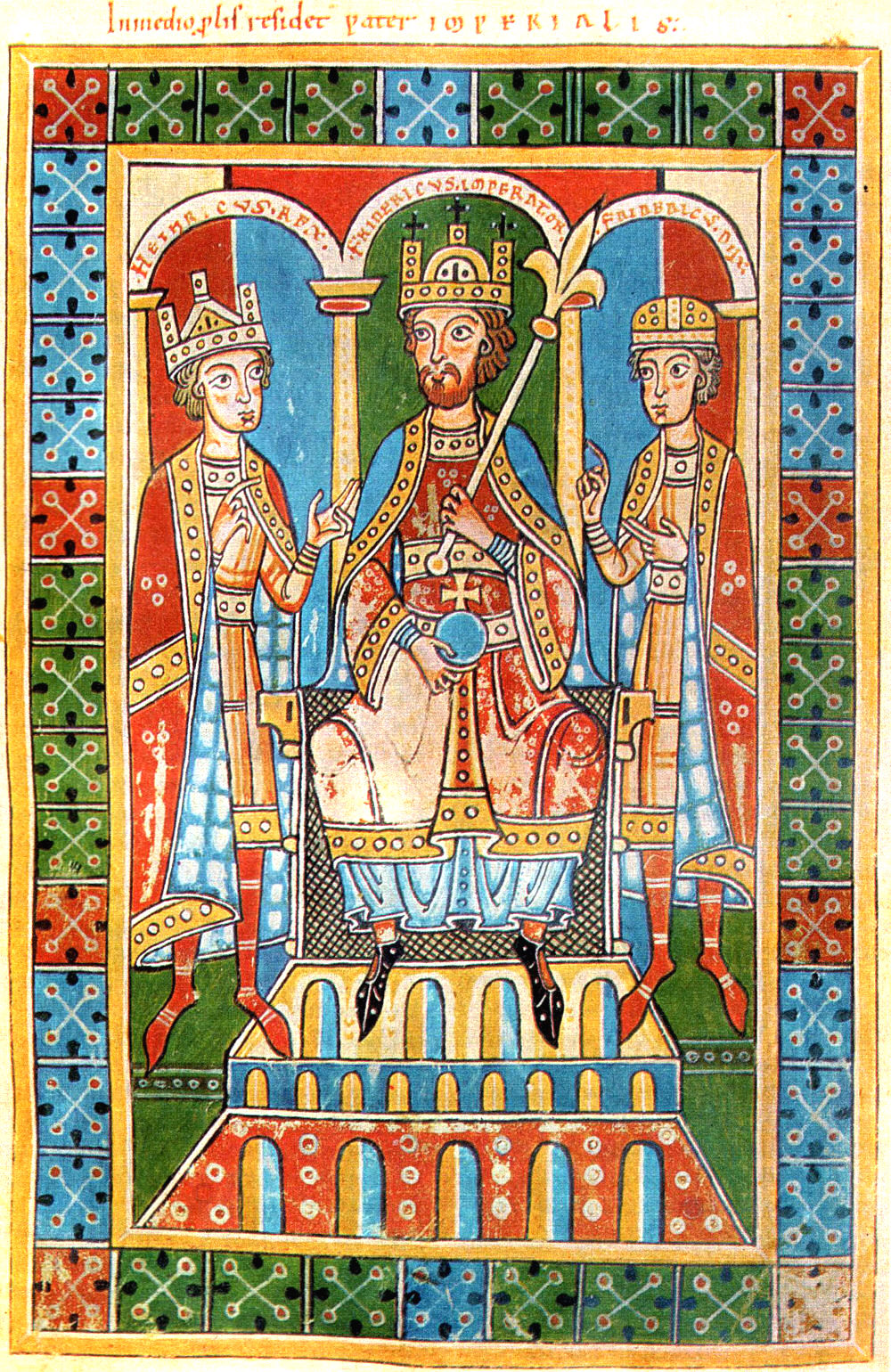
- Friedrich Barbarossa, Holy Roman Emperor
- Pronunciation: German: [ˈfʁiːdʁɪç]
- Gender: male

Origin
- Meaning: peaceful ruler

Other names
- Related names: Frederick, Fredrik, Federico, Frederik, ...

Friedrich is a German male given name and the origin of the English Frederick. People with the name include:

== Arts ==
- Friedrich Silaban (1912–1984), Indonesian architect.
- Friedrich Goldscheider (1845–1897), Bohemia-born Austrian entrepreneur, and a manufacturer of ceramics and bronze
- Friedrich Gorenstein (1932–2002), Russian author and screenwriter
- Friedrich Hohe (1802–1870), German lithographer and painter
- Friedrich Hölderlin (1770–1843), German poet, one of the key figures in German Romanticism
- Friedrich Hundertwasser (1928–2000), Austrian artist and architect, better known as Friedensreich Hundertwasser
- Friedrich Joloff (1908–1988), German actor
- Friedrich "Fritz" Lang (1890–1976), film maker
- Otto Friedrich Walter (1928–1994), Swiss journalist, author and publisher
- Friedrich von Hardenberg (1772–1801), German poet and philosopher, better known as Novalis
- Friedrich Schiller (1759–1805), German poet and philosopher

== Music ==
- Christian Friedrich Johannes Büttner (1979), German DJ, record producer and musician known as TheFatRat
- Friedrich von Flotow (1812–1883), German composer
- Friedrich Gulda (1930–2000), Austrian pianist and composer
- Georg Friedrich Händel (1685–1759), German, later British, Baroque composer
- Friedrich Kautz, (born 1979), "Prinz Pi", German rapper
- Friedrich Seitz (1848–1918), German romantic era composer
- Friedrich Smetana (1824–1884), Czech composer who pioneered the development of a musical style that became closely identified with his country's aspirations to independent statehood, regarded in his homeland as the father of Czech music

== Philosophy ==
- Friedrich Engels (1820–1895), German political philosopher, communist, social scientist, journalist and businessman, developer of what is now known as Marxist theory and The Communist Manifesto
- Friedrich Hayek (1899–1992), Austrian economist and political philosopher
- Friedrich Nietzsche (1844–1900), German philosopher, cultural critic, composer, poet, philologist, and Latin and Greek scholar whose work has exerted a profound influence on modern intellectual history
- Friedrich Schiller (1759-1805), German poet, philosopher, physician, historian and playwright
- Friedrich Schelling (1775-1854), German philosopher of nature, idealism, mythology, and Christianity

== Other fields ==
- Friedrich von Utrecht (c. 780–834/838), saint, bishop of Utrecht
- Friedrich der Große (1712–1786), King of Prussia, Frederick the Great
- Friedrich Sixt von Armin, German general who participated in the Franco-Prussian War and the First World War
- Archduke Friedrich, Duke of Teschen (1856–1936)
- Archduke Friedrich of Austria (1821–1847)
- Friedrich Ludwig Abresch (1699–1782), German born Dutch philologist
- Friedrich Baumbach (1935–2025), German chess grandmaster
- Friedrich Bergius (1884–1949), German chemist
- Johann Friedrich Blumenbach, German physician, naturalist, physiologist, and anthropologist, one of the first to explore the study of the human being as an aspect of natural history
- Friedrich Buchardt, Baltic German SS functionary who commanded Vorkommando Moskau, one of the divisions of Einsatzgruppe B, Post-war worked for MI6 (until 1947) and then, presumably, for the CIA
- Friedrich Wilhelm Freiherr von Bülow, German General during Napoleonic Wars
- Friedrich Christiansen (1879–1972), German flying ace during World War I and commander of the German Wehrmacht in the occupied Netherlands during World War II
- Friedrich Czapek, plant physiologist who developed Czapek medium
- Friedrich Dickel (1913–1993), German politician
- Friedrich Doll, German democrat and commercial traveller.
- Friedrich Robert Faehlmann (1798-1850), Estonian writer, medical doctor and philologist, founder of University of Tartu and one of the authors of Kalevipoeg
- Friedrich Ebert (1871–1925), German politician and President of Germany 1919-1925 (SPD)
- Friedrich Ebert Jr. (1894–1979), German politician (SPD and SED)
- Friedrich Karl Florian (1894–1975), Gauleiter of Düsseldorf in Nazi Germany
- Friedrich Fröbel (1782–1852), German pedagogue
- Friedrich Fromm (1888–1945), German army officer, Commander in Chief of the Reserve Army (Ersatzheer), in charge of training and personnel replacement for combat divisions of the German Army, executed for failing to act against the plot of 20 July 1944 to assassinate Hitler
- Friedrich Geisshardt (1919–1943), German World War II flying ace
- Friedrich von Gerok, German World War I general
- Friedrich Goldmann (1941–2009), German composer and conductor
- Friedrich August Grotefend (1798–1836), German philologist
- Carl Friedrich Goerdeler (1884–1945), monarchist conservative German politician, executive, economist, civil servant, and opponent of the Nazi regime
- Friedrich "Fritz" Haarmann (1879-1920), prolific German cannibalistic serial killer, rapist, and fraudster
- Friedrich "Fritz" Hartjenstein (1905–1954), German Nazi SS concentration camp commandant
- Friedrich Herrlein, German World War II general
- Friedrich Hildebrandt (1898–1948), German SS Obergruppenführer, a Gauleiter, executed for war crimes
- Friedrich Hirzebruch (1927–2012), German mathematician
- Friedrich von Ingenohl (1857–1933), German admiral from Neuwied best known for his command of the German High Seas Fleet at the beginning of World War I
- Friedrich Jeckeln (1895–1946), German SS commander during the Nazi era, Higher SS and Police Leader in the occupied Soviet Union during World War, commander of one of the largest collection of Einsatzgruppen death squads, personally responsible for ordering and organizing the deaths of over 100,000 Jews, Romani, and others designated by the Nazis as "undesirables", the principal perpetrator of Rumbula massacre
- Friedrich Kellner (1885–1970), mid-level official in Germany who worked as a justice inspector in Mainz and Laubach, best known for his diaries that got published in the original German in 2011 and in English by Cambridge University Press in 2018.
- Friedrich Reinhold Kreutzwald (1803-1882), Estonian writer, one of the authors of Kalevipoeg
- Friedrich-Wilhelm Krüger (1894–1945), Nazi official and high-ranking member of the SA and the SS, Higher SS and Police Leader in the General Government in German-occupied Poland and one of the major perpetrators of the Holocaust
- Friedrich Leibacher (1944–2001), Swiss mass murderer
- Friedrich Loeffler (1852–1915), German bacteriologist
- Friedrich Kasimir Medikus (1738–1808), German physician and botanist
- Friedrich Merz (born 1955), German politician, Chancellor of Germany (2025–)
- Friedrich Olbricht (1888–1944), German general during World War II and one of the plotters involved in the 20 July Plot, an attempt to assassinate Hitler in 1944
- Friedrich Panzinger (1903–1959), German SS officer during the Nazi era, head of the Reich Main Security Office (Reichssicherheitshauptamt; RSHA) Amt IV A, from September 1943 to May 1944 and the commanding officer of Einsatzgruppe A in the Baltic States and Belarus
- Friedrich Paulus (1890–1957), German field marshal during World War II who commanded the 6th Army during the Battle of Stalingrad, one of the principal commanders of Operation Uranus
- Carl Friedrich von Pückler-Burghauss, German military leader and politician
- Friedrich Pürner (born 1967), German politician
- Friedrich von Rabenau (1884–1945), German General of the Artillery, theologian, and opponent of National Socialism
- Friedrich Rainer (1903–1947), Austrian Nazi politician, Gauleiter as well as a state governor of Salzburg and Carinthia
- Friedrich Ratzel, German geographer and ethnographer
- Friedrich "Fritz" Sauckel, German Nazi politician, Gauleiter of Thuringia and the General Plenipotentiary for Labour Deployment from March 1942 until the end of the Second World War
- Friedrich von Scholtz (1851-1927), German general, military leader and army commander
- Friedrich Sämisch (1896–1975), German chess player
- Friedrich Spee (1591-1635), German Jesuit priest, professor, and poet, most well known as a forceful opponent of witch trials
- Friedrich Stieve (1884-1966), German writer and historian
- Friedrich Joachim Stengel (1694–1787), German architect
- Friedrich Syrup (1881–1945), Nazi jurist and politician
- Friedrich Trump (1869–1918), German-American businessman, grandfather of 45th U.S. president Donald Trump
- Friedrich Weinwurm (1985–1942), Slovak architect
- Friedrich Wetter (born 1928), German Roman Catholic Cardinal
- Friedrich Wöhler (1800–1882), German chemist who synthesised urea

== See also ==
- Federico
- Fred (disambiguation)
- Freddo
- Freddy (disambiguation)
- Frédéric
- Frederick (given name)
- Frederico
- Fredrik
- Fryderyk (given name)
- Friedreich
- Fried (disambiguation)
