= Prii (surname) =

Prii is an Estonian surname. It used to be a protected surname in Estonia, entered into the Family Name Protection Register under No. 394 in 1940. Notable people with the surname include:

- Andrei Prii (1938–2022), Estonian economist and politician
- Uno Prii (1924–2000), Estonian-born Canadian architect

== See also ==
- Priit
