= Freddie Clayton =

English cricketer

Personal information
- Full name: Frederick George Hugh Clayton
- Born: 5 January 1873; Newcastle upon Tyne, Northumberland, England
- Died: 20 March 1946 (aged 73); Warkworth, Northumberland, England
- Batting: Right-handed
- Bowling: Right-arm medium

Domestic team information
- Years: Team
- 1893–1896: Oxford University
- 1896–1906: Northumberland

Career statistics
Competition	First-class
Matches	9
Runs scored	332
Batting average	20.75
100s/50s	–/3
Top score	68
Balls bowled	896
Wickets	18
Bowling average	29.16
5 wickets in innings	1
10 wickets in match	–
Best bowling	7/70
Catches/stumpings	5/–
- Source: Cricinfo, 18 June 2019

Frederick George Hugh Clayton (5 January 1873 – 20 March 1946) was an English first-class cricketer. In a first-class career which spanned from 1893 to 1902, he appeared mostly for Oxford University, making nine first-class appearances.

== Life and cricket career ==
Clayton was born at Newcastle upon Tyne in January 1873. He was educated at Harrow School, before attending University College, Oxford. While studying at Oxford, Clayton made his debut in first-class cricket for Oxford University against Somerset at Oxford in 1893. He played first-class cricket for Oxford University until 1896, making six appearances, in addition to playing one first-class match for the Gentlemen of England against Oxford University in 1895. He scored 151 runs in six matches for the university, with a high score of 66. With his right-arm medium pace bowling, he took 7 wickets with best figures of 3 for 144. He also played rackets for Oxford, playing alongside Harry Foster in 1895 when the pair defeated Cambridge. He did not succeed in getting a blue while at Oxford.

He later toured British India with the Oxford University Authentics cricket team, playing two first-class matches against Bombay and the Parsees at Bombay in November 1902. He scored 148 runs at an average of 49.33 during the tour, including making his highest first-class score of 68. He also bowled impressively on the tour, taking 10 wickets at 18.20 apiece, with best figures of 7 for 70 against Bombay. In addition to playing at first-class level, he also played minor counties cricket for Northumberland between 1896 and 1906, making 75 appearances in the Minor Counties Championship. He remained associated with Northumberland even after he stopped playing, serving at the club secretary from 1897 to 1923, treasurer from 1903 to 1945 and president from 1935 to 1945. He died at Warkworth in March 1946.
