= Federico Presedo =

Argentine footballer

Personal information
- Full name: Federico Ezequiel Presedo
- Date of birth: 28 August 1992 (age 34)
- Place of birth: Morón, Argentina
- Height: 1.66 m (5 ft 5 in)
- Position: Midfielder

Team information
- Current team: JJ Urquiza

Youth career
- Almirante Brown

Senior career*
| Years | Team | Apps | (Gls) |
| 2012–2015 | Almirante Brown | 46 | (2) |
| 2015–2019 | Fénix | 69 | (10) |
| 2017–2019 | → Nueva Chicago (loan) | 15 | (0) |
| 2019–2021 | Atlanta | 11 | (0) |
| 2021– | JJ Urquiza | 30 | (2) |
- * Club domestic league appearances and goals as of 17:34, 8 June 2022 (UTC)

Federico Ezequiel Presedo (born 28 August 1992) is an Argentine professional footballer who plays as a midfielder for JJ Urquiza.

== Career ==
Almirante Brown were Presedo's first club. He participated in the opening match of his career in Primera B Nacional on 23 September 2012 against Gimnasia y Esgrima, which was followed by his first goal versus Sarmiento in April 2013. Ten total appearances arrived in 2012–13, with Presedo receiving a red card against Patronato in his last game. Almirante Brown suffered relegation in 2013–14, with Presedo going on to participate twenty-one times in Primera B Metropolitana up to 2015. Presedo left to join Fénix midway through the year. He remained for three campaigns whilst scoring ten goals in sixty-nine matches.

On 31 July 2017, Presedo was loaned to Primera B Nacional's Nueva Chicago for 2017–18 and 2018–19. He featured just four times in the former, all of which were off the substitutes bench, after suffering a cruciate ligament injury.

== Career statistics ==
As of 27 February 2019.

Appearances and goals by club, season and competition
| Club | Season | League | | | Cup | | Continental | | Other | | Total | |
| Club | Season | Division | Apps | Goals | Apps | Goals | Apps | Goals | Apps | Goals | Apps | Goals |
|---|---|---|---|---|---|---|---|---|---|---|---|---|
| Almirante Brown | 2012–13 | Primera B Nacional | 10 | 1 | 0 | 0 | — | | 0 | 0 | 10 | 1 |
| Almirante Brown | 2013–14 | Primera B Nacional | 15 | 0 | 1 | 0 | — | | 0 | 0 | 16 | 0 |
| Almirante Brown | 2014 | Primera B Metropolitana | 9 | 1 | 2 | 1 | — | | 0 | 0 | 11 | 2 |
| Almirante Brown | 2015 | Primera B Metropolitana | 12 | 0 | 1 | 0 | — | | 0 | 0 | 13 | 0 |
| Almirante Brown | Total | | 46 | 2 | 4 | 1 | — | | 0 | 0 | 50 | 3 |
| Fénix | 2015 | Primera B Metropolitana | 19 | 1 | 0 | 0 | — | | 0 | 0 | 19 | 1 |
| Fénix | 2016 | Primera B Metropolitana | 19 | 2 | 0 | 0 | — | | 0 | 0 | 19 | 2 |
| Fénix | 2016–17 | Primera B Metropolitana | 31 | 7 | 0 | 0 | — | | 0 | 0 | 31 | 7 |
| Fénix | 2017–18 | Primera B Metropolitana | 0 | 0 | 0 | 0 | — | | 0 | 0 | 0 | 0 |
| Fénix | 2018–19 | Primera B Metropolitana | 0 | 0 | 0 | 0 | — | | 0 | 0 | 0 | 0 |
| Fénix | Total | | 69 | 10 | 0 | 0 | — | | 0 | 0 | 69 | 10 |
| Nueva Chicago (loan) | 2017–18 | Primera B Nacional | 4 | 0 | 0 | 0 | — | | 0 | 0 | 4 | 0 |
| Nueva Chicago (loan) | 2018–19 | Primera B Nacional | 5 | 0 | 0 | 0 | — | | 0 | 0 | 5 | 0 |
| Nueva Chicago (loan) | Total | | 9 | 0 | 0 | 0 | — | | 0 | 0 | 9 | 0 |
| Career total | | | 124 | 12 | 4 | 1 | — | | 0 | 0 | 128 | 13 |
