= Friedrich Doll =

19th-century German revolutionary

Friedrich Doll was a German democrat and commercial traveller. He took part in the republican uprisings in Baden in 1848. Doll also commanded a division during the Baden-Palatinate uprising of 1849.
