= Fast Freddie =

Fast Freddie may refer to:

== People nicknamed Fast Freddie ==
- Fred Lorenzen (born 1934), American former NASCAR driver
- Fred Rodriguez (born 1973), American road racing cyclist
- Jonathan Smith (wide receiver) (born 1981), American football player
- Freddie Spencer (born 1961), American former world champion motorcycle racer
- Alfred Goulet (1944-2021), Street Drag Racer Ottawa, Ontario

== Other uses ==
- Fast Freddie (video game), an arcade video game by Kaneko
- a title character of Fast Freddie, The Widow and Me, a 2011 UK Christmas special television programme
