= Freddie Burch =

English footballer (1886–??)

Personal information
- Full name: Frederick Burch
- Date of birth: 1886
- Place of birth: Plymouth, England
- Position: Outside forward

Senior career*
Years	Team	Apps	(Gls)
1904–1908	Plymouth Argyle	35	(4)
1908–1909	Reading		
1909–1919	Plymouth Argyle	193	(84)
- Torquay Town
- * Club domestic league appearances and goals

Frederick Burch was an English footballer who played as an outside forward. He appeared in the Southern League for Plymouth Argyle and Reading. Born in Plymouth, Burch was the top goalscorer in the Southern League during the 1912–13 season.

== Playing career ==
An outside forward who could also play in other forward positions, Burch played for St Budeaux and Essa – two local clubs in the Plymouth area – before joining Southern League club Plymouth Argyle in 1904. He made his first team debut in a 3–1 win against Wellingborough in February 1905, but had to wait 18 months for his next appearance. He scored his first goal for the club in a 1–0 win against Southampton in October 1906 and established himself in the team towards the end of the 1906–07 campaign. His 30 goals in 37 league matches during the 1912–13 season helped Argyle become Southern League champions for the first time, and he finished the season as the top goalscorer in the league. Among them was a hat-trick against Merthyr Town and four in one game against Southampton. Described as being "always a trier" in one of the club's handbooks, Burch is seventh on Plymouth Argyle's all-time list of goalscorers – he managed 91 goals in 240 appearances in all competitions.

== Honours ==
Plymouth Argyle

- Southern League winner: 1912–13
