= Frederick Creek (Minnesota) =

Stream in Wright County, Minnesota, U.S.

Coordinates: 45°06′36″N 93°53′27″W

Frederick Creek is a stream in Wright County, in the U.S. state of Minnesota.

Frederick Creek was named for an early settler.

== See also ==
- List of rivers of Minnesota
