= Fred (restaurant) =

Coordinates: 51°55′1.15″N 4°31′3.49″E

- Interactive map of Fred

Restaurant information
- Established: 2008
- Head chef: Fred Mustert
- Food type: French, International
- Rating: Michelin Guide
- Location: Honingerdijk 263, Rotterdam, 3063 AM, Netherlands
- Seating capacity: 50
- Website: Official website

Fred is a restaurant in Rotterdam, Netherlands. It is a fine dining restaurant that was awarded one Michelin star for the period 2010–2013, and two stars since 2014.

GaultMillau awarded the restaurant 16 out of 20 points.

Head chef of Fred is Fred Mustert.

Restaurant Fred is a member of the Alliance Gastronomique Néerlandaise since December 2010.

== See also ==
- List of Michelin starred restaurants in the Netherlands
