= Federico León =

Argentine footballer (born 1984)

Personal information
- Full name: Federico Matías León
- Date of birth: 30 October 1984 (age 42)
- Place of birth: Resistencia, Argentina
- Height: 1.80 m (5 ft 11 in)
- Position: Defender

Youth career
- Boca Juniors

Senior career*
Years	Team	Apps	(Gls)
2003–2005	Boca Juniors	1	(0)
2005–2006	Elche B	–	(–)
2006–2007	Malaga B	20	(1)
2007–2008	Almirante Brown	36	(2)
2008–2009	Ferro Carril Oeste	13	(0)
2009	Tristán Suárez	0	(0)
2009–2012	Almirante Brown	62	(1)
2012–2013	Deportes Iquique	23	(1)
2013–2017	Aldosivi	63	(1)
2017–2018	Barracas Central	29	(0)
2018–2020	Sarmiento de Resistencia	14	(0)
Total		261	(6)
- * Club domestic league appearances and goals

Federico Matías León (born 30 October 1984) is an Argentine former footballer who played as a defender.

== Career ==
=== Club ===
León started his career with Boca Juniors and made one appearance for the club before going to join Spanish side Elche's reserve team. He failed to make a league appearance for them before making the move to Málaga's reserve team, Malaga B, but again didn't make an appearance. After two years away, León returned to Argentina in 2007 to join Almirante Brown. He participated in 36 matches for Almirante Brown before leaving to sign for Ferro Carril Oeste but, after 13 games for Ferro, he returned to Almirante Brown a year after departing; via a short stint with Tristán Suárez. León and Almirante Brown won promotion into the Primera B Nacional for 2010–11 after winning the Primera B Metropolitana. 62 appearances and 2 goals followed in the Primera B Nacional for him before he left in 2012 and subsequently joined Primera División of Chile side Deportes Iquique. He scored once in 23 league games for the Chilean side. In July 2013, León signed for Aldosivi.

== Career statistics ==
=== Club ===
As of 30 October 2016.

Club statistics
Club	Season	League			Cup (Note: Includes the Copa Argentina)		League Cup		Continental (Note: Includes the Copa Libertadores and Copa Sudamericana)		Other		Total	
Club	Season	Division	Apps	Goals	Apps	Goals	Apps	Goals	Apps	Goals	Apps	Goals	Apps	Goals
Aldosivi	2013–14	Primera B Nacional	24	0	0	0	—		—		0	0	24	0
Aldosivi	2014	Primera B Nacional	9	0	0	0	—		—		0	0	9	0
Aldosivi	2015	Primera División	24	1	0	0	—		—		0	0	24	1
Aldosivi	2016	Primera División	0	0	0	0	—		—		0	0	0	0
Aldosivi	2016–17	Primera División	6	0	0	0	—		—		0	0	6	0
Aldosivi	Total		63	1	0	0	—		—		0	0	63	1
Career total			63	1	0	0	—		—		0	0	63	1

== Honours ==
Almirante Brown

- Primera B Metropolitana (1): 2009–10
