= Paris–Dakar Bike Race =

The Paris Dakar Bike Race is a cycle race of 7,000 kilometers through France, Andorra, Spain, Morocco, Western Sahara, Mauritania and Senegal organized by Bike Dreams, a Netherlands-based company. The race lasts 10 weeks and is divided in 59 stages and 11 rest days. The races crosses the Sahara desert by the Atlantic Route. It is not related to the Dakar Rally in which entrants use only motorized transport.

== Results ==
Year	Start	Finish	km	Winner	First female
2006	10 September	18 November	7206	Priit Salumäe (EST)	Hanneke Breebaart (NED)
2007	9 September	17 November	7217	John Faulkner (NZL)	Mieke Arendsen (NED)
2009	6 September	14 November	7193	Eric Voutaz (SUI)	Toos van Beijsterveldt (NED)

In 2010 the event was cancelled indefinitely by the organisers following negative travel advice for Mauritania. By early 2019, the situation in Mauritania had improved and Bike Dreams announced the ride would restart in 2020. There was tremendous interest internationally and the ride was filled within less than a week, a year and a half in advance. The 2020 edition was to start in Paris on September 6 and end in Dakar on November 17. Due to Covid-19, the 2020 edition was postponed to 2021 and then to 2022. This edition ended up being cancelled completely in late 2021.

In December 2022, it was on again, for September 3 to Nov 12, 2023. However this edition will not be done as a race. It will be a long-distance fully supported bike tour.
