= Fredricks =

Fredricks is a surname. Notable people with the surname include:

- Charles D. Fredricks (1823–1894), American photographer
- Edgar Fredricks (1942–2016), American politician
- Paul Fredricks (1918–2010), German-American brass musician
- Richard Fredricks (born 1933), American opera singer
- Tucker Fredricks (born 1984), American speed skater
