= Fred (surname) =

Fred is the surname of:

- Edwin Broun Fred (1887–1981), American bacteriologist
- Jalo Aatos Fred (1917–2003), Finnish chess player
- John Fred (1941–2005), American musician
