= Fadrique =

Fadrique may refer to:

- Fadrique Alfonso, Lord of Haro (1334–1358), illegitimate son of King Alfonso XI of Castile
- Fadrique Álvarez de Toledo, 2nd Duke of Alba (c. 1460-1531), Spanish military leader and politician
- Fadrique Álvarez de Toledo, 4th Duke of Alba (1537-1583), Grandee of Spain and a commander in the Spanish army during the Eighty Years' War
- Fadrique Álvarez de Toledo, 1st Marquis of Villanueva de Valdueza (1580-1634), Captain General of the Spanish Navy
- Fadrique Álvarez de Toledo, the name of the six Dukes of Fernandina
- Fadrique Enríquez (c. 1465–1538), fourth Admiral of Castile
- Fadrique Enríquez de Mendoza (1390-1473), second Admiral of Castile, Count of Melgar and Rueda, and Lord of Medina del Rioseco
- Fadrique de Portugal (c. 1465–1539), Spanish viceroy of Catalonia and bishop of Sigüenza
- Alfonso Fadrique (died 1338), eldest and illegitimate son of Frederick II of Sicily, vicar general of the Duchy of Athens
- Pedro I Fadrique (died 1355), Count of Salona, vicar general of the Duchy of Athens, son of Alfonso Fadrique
- Louis Fadrique (died 1382), Count of Salona, Count of Zitouni and Lord of Aegina, vicar general of the Duchy of Athens, grandson of Alfonso Fadrique
