= Fredrik =

- Pronunciation: Swedish: [ˈfrěːdrɪk] Danish: [ˈfʁeðˀʁek, ˈfʁæðˀʁæk]
- Gender: Male

Origin
- Origin: Germanic
- Meaning: "Peaceful Ruler"
- Region of origin: renchic

Other names
- Related names: Friedrich, Frederick

Fredrik or Frederik is a masculine Germanic given name derived from the German name Friedrich or Friederich, from the Old High German fridu meaning "peace" and rîhhi meaning "ruler" or "power". It is the common form of Frederick in Norway, Finland and Sweden. The name means "peaceful ruler" The most common variant spelling of this name is Frederik which is used in Denmark, although the English spelling Frederick is more common than either. Fredrik replaced the Anglo-Saxon name Freodheric, and has been a rare first name in England since this time.

In Sweden, Fredrik first fell into usage in the 14th century, and became increasingly common after the 18th century. It is the 19th most popular male name in Sweden and the 41st most popular in Norway. It has a name day in Sweden, on July 18. Common diminutive forms include: Fred, Frillo, Fredde, Freddy, Freddie, and Rikke.

== Notable people with this name ==
- Fredrik Ardraa (born 2006), Norwegian footballer
- Fredrik Aursnes (born 1995), Norwegian footballer
- Fredrik Bajer: winner of the Nobel Prize in 1908 for peace
- Fredrik Barth (1928–2016), Norwegian anthropologist
- Fredrik Bild (born 1974), Swedish footballer
- Fredrik Florén (born 1971), Swedish diplomat
- Fredrik Haga: Finnish football executive, coach and former player
- Fredrik Jensen (disambiguation)
- Fredrik Letzler: Swedish freestyle swimmer
- Fredrik Lindgren (musician) (1971–2025), Swedish musician
- Freddie Ljungberg: Swedish footballer
- Fredrik Lundh Sammeli (born 1977), Swedish politician
- Fredrik Lundgren (born 1979), Swedish footballer
- Frederik Magle: Danish composer, organist and pianist
- Fredrik Modin (born 1974), Swedish ice hockey player
- Frederik Paludan-Müller: Danish poet
- Frederik Pohl: American writer
- Fredrik Reinfeldt: Swedish Prime Minister
- Fredrik Sjøvold (born 2003), Norwegian footballer
- Fredrik Skavlan: Norwegian chat show host
- Frederik Stang: Norwegian politician
- Fredrik Svanbäck: Finnish footballer
- Fredrik Thordendal: Swedish musician
- Frederick Douglass: American abolitionist
- Fredrik deBoer: American academic

== Other instances of this name ==
- There have been two Kings of Sweden with this name: Fredrik I (1720–1751) and Adolf Fredrik (1751–1771)
- The name Fredrik is also the basis for two European surnames:
- Frisian: Vick
- German, Polish: Frick
- Swedish band Fredrik

== Variations of this name ==
=== Male ===
- Afrikaans: Frederik, Freek
- Czech: Bedřich
- Danish: Frederik / Fredrik
- Dutch: Frederik
- Emilian: Fedrîgh
- English: Frederic / Frederick
- Estonian: Priidu, Priit
- French: Frédéric, Frédérick
- Frisian: Freddercke, Freerk
- German: Friedrich
- Greek: Φρειδερίκος
- Hawaiian: Peleke
- Hungarian: Frigyes
- Icelandic: Friðrik
- Italian: Federico
- Latvian: Frīdrihs, Fricis
- Polish: Fryderyk
- Portuguese: Frederico
- Romanian: Frederic
- Slovene: Friderik
- Spanish: Federico

=== Female ===
- Czech: Bedřiška
- Dutch: Frederika
- Danish: Frederikke
- English: Frederica
- French: Frédérique
- German: Friederike
- Greek: Frideriki
- Icelandic:Friðrika
- Italian: Federica
- Norwegian: Fredrikke
- Polish: Fryderyka
- Romanian: Frederica
- Swedish:Fredrika, Fredrica
- Spanish: Federica
