= Fryderyk (given name) =

Fryderyk (Polish: [frɨˈdɛrɨk]) is a male given name, and may refer to:

- Fryderyk Chopin (1810–1849), a Polish piano composer
- Fryderyk Getkant (1600–1666), a military engineer, artilleryman and cartographer of German origin
- Fryderyk Scherfke (1909–1983), an interwar Polish soccer midfield player
- Michał Fryderyk Czartoryski (1696–1775), a Polish szlachcic

== See also ==
- Fryderyk Chopin (ship), a Polish sailing-ship launched in 1992 in the Dora Shipyard, Gdańsk, Poland
- Federico
- Fred
- Freddie
- Freddo
- Freddy
- Frédéric
- Frederick (given name)
- Frederico
- Fredrik
- Fredro
- Friedrich
