= Frederick (German ship) =

German ship

History

German Empire
- Name: Frederick
- Out of service: 15 March 1876
- Fate: wrecked near Audresselles, France on 15 March 1876

General characteristics
- Type: brig or schooner

Frederick also written as Frederica Pattenborg Zetland was a German brig or schooner sailing ship in the 19th century. Due to a storm, the ship wrecked between Audresselles and Cap Gris Nez, Pas-de-Calais, France on 15 March 1876. There were only two survivors.

== Fate ==
In 1876 the ship was on a voyage from Hamburg, Germany to Rosario, Argentina. The cargo of the ship consisted of wine, alcohol, packs of sheets, linen and other fabrics. The people on board consisted of the 21-years-old captain, his 21-years-old wife, their child and several sailors.

In the night of 15 March 1876 there was a storm and the ship was driven ashore and wrecked between Audresselles and Cap Gris Nez, Pas-de-Calais, France. Due to the bad weather and darkness, no one saw the ship in distress. To stay out of the water, the captain, his wife and the sailors climbed into the masts. The captain and his wife had left their child in the cabin. After several hours, the masts threatened to break. The captain jumped into the sea. The captain did not want to leave his wife, who was numb from cold and fatigued. While they held each other, the main mast fell on them and they drowned. Several sailors also drowned, two managed to reach the coast.

== Aftermath ==
One of them who survived managed to drag himself to a house. However, because of the way he looked, his torn clothes and different language the residents were suspicious. He was eventually allowed to sleep in the barn. However, when they realized what had happened, they tried to help the man as best they could, but he remained seriously ill.

The ship was smashed off the coast and shattered. Parts of the ship and the ship's cargo washed ashore over a length of several miles. The bodies of the captain, his wife and some sailors were found. They were buried at the cemetery of Audresselles.
