= Federico Hindermann =

Swiss publisher and translator

- Born: July 27, 1921; Biella, Piedmont, Italy
- Died: January 31, 2012 (aged 90); Aarau, Switzerland
- Citizenship: Basel
- Education: University of Basel; University of Zurich
- Occupations: Publisher, translator, writer, teacher
- Years active: 1947–1986
- Known for: Director of Manesse Verlag (1971–1986)
- Spouse: Mathilde Kraft (m. 1947)
- Partner: Anna Felder
- Children: 1 daughter

Federico Hindermann (27 July 1921 – 31 January 2012) was a Swiss publisher, translator, and writer. He served as director of Manesse Verlag in Zurich from 1971 to 1986, where he published numerous works translated from French and Italian in the Manesse Bibliothek der Weltliteratur series.

== Biography ==
Federico Hindermann was born on 27 July 1921 in Biella, Piedmont, to Max Hindermann, a merchant, and Amalia Filippi. He held citizenship of Basel. In 1947, he married Mathilde Kraft, a pediatrician. He later had a long-term relationship with writer Anna Felder, with whom he had a daughter.

Hindermann studied Romance languages and literature and comparative literature at the Universities of Basel and Zurich, earning his doctorate in 1955. He worked as a cultural journalist for the National-Zeitung and as an editor for Atlantis publishing house from 1947. In 1950, he served as a lecturer in German language and literature at Oxford. From 1955, he worked as a high school teacher, and from 1966 to 1969 as professor of Italian and French at the University of Erlangen-Nuremberg.

== Career at Manesse Verlag ==
From 1971 to 1986, Hindermann directed Manesse Verlag in Zurich. During his tenure, he published numerous translated works from French and Italian in the Manesse Bibliothek der Weltliteratur collection, contributing significantly to the dissemination of Romance literature in the German-speaking world.

== Literary work ==
Hindermann was a prolific translator, rendering works by Emilio Cecchi, Luigi Pirandello, Anna Felder, Elio Vittorini, Albert Camus, Gérard de Nerval, and Jules Supervielle into German. He also wrote poetry in both German and Italian. His own poetic works include Quanto silenzio (1992) and Girandola di farfalle (2006).

== Death ==
Hindermann died on 31 January 2012 in Aarau, Switzerland.
