= Fricis =

Male given name

- Gender: Male
- Name day: 14 November

Origin
- Region of origin: Latvia

Other names
- Related names: Frīdrihs

Fricis is a Latvian masculine given name. It is derived from the name Frīdrihs (a cognate of Frederick) and the associated name day is November 14.

== Notable people named Fricis ==
- Fricis Apšenieks (1894–1941), Latvian chess master
- Fricis Bārda (1880–1919), Latvian poet
- Fricis Dambrēvics (1906–?), Latvian football forward
- Fricis Kaņeps (1916–1981), Latvian footballer
- Fricis Laumanis (1910–1981), Latvian football defender
- Fricis Rokpelnis (1909–1969), Latvian poet and writer
- Fricis Roziņš (1870–1919), Latvian Marxist revolutionary, publicist, essayist, columnist and one of the founders of the Communist Party of Latvia
