= Fritz =

- Language: German

Origin
- Language: German
- Region of origin: German language communities

Other names
- Related names: Friedrich, Frederick, Frederic, Fred, Fridolin, Francis (less common)

Fritz is a common German male given name and also a surname. The name originated as a German diminutive of Friedrich or Frederick (Der Alte Fritz, and Stary Fryc were common nicknames for King Frederick II of Prussia and Frederick III, German Emperor), as well as of similar names including Fridolin and, less commonly, Francis. Fritz (Fryc) was also a name given to German troops by Allies soldier similar to the term Tommy. Other common bases for which the name Fritz was used include the surnames Fritsche, Fritzsche, Fritsch, Frisch(e) and Frycz.

Below is a list of notable people with the name "Fritz".

== Surname ==
- Amanda Fritz (born 1958), retired registered psychiatric nurse and politician from Oregon
- Al Fritz (1924–2013), American businessman
- Ben Fritz (born 1981), American baseball coach
- Betty Jane Fritz (1924–1994), one of the original players in the All-American Girls Professional Baseball League
- Clemens Fritz (born 1980), German footballer
- David Fritz, American politician
- Edmund Fritz (before 1918–after 1932), Austrian actor, film director, and music manager
- Elisabet Fritz (died 1752), Swedish industrialist
- Florian Fritz (born 1984), French rugby union player
- Frank Fritz, co-star of History Channel's American Pickers
- Hans-Georg Fritz (1932–2026), German politician
- James Fritz (active 2023), British playwright
- John Fritz, (1822–1913), American pioneer of iron and steel technology
- Johny Fritz (born 1944), Luxembourgish composer
- Jürgen Fritz (born 1953), German musician, keyboard player in the rock band Triumvirat
- Lanja Fritz (born 1995), Nauruan sprinter
- Madeleine Fritz (1896–1990), Canadian palaeontologist
- Nel Fritz (born 1937), Dutch Olympic gymnast
- Oscar M. Fritz (1878–1957), American jurist
- Reinhold Fritz (1884–1950), German bass-baritone
- Roger Fritz (1936–2021), German actor, director, producer and photographer
- Rose L. Fritz (1888–1959), World's fastest typist 1907, 1908, and 1909
- Sophie Wolff-Fritz (1858–1938), German composer, singer and teacher
- Taylor Fritz (born 1997), American professional tennis player
- William Harold Fritz (1928–2009), Geologist with the Geological Survey of Canada
- Willie Fritz (born 1960), American football coach

== Given name ==
- Francis "Fritz" Barzilauskas (1920–1990), American National Football League player
- Fritz Bauer (1903–1968), German Jewish judge and prosecutor who initiated the Auschwitz trials and aided the capture of Adolf Eichmann
- Fritz Baumgarten (illustrator) (1883–1966), German artist, author, and children's author-illustrator
- Fritz Baumgarten (1886–1961), German footballer
- Fritz Bayerlein (1899–1970), German Nazi general during WWII
- Fritz Bing (1934–2023), South African cricketer, businessman and cricket administrator
- Fritz Bondroit (1912–1974), German canoeist
- Fritz Buntrock (1909–1948), German Nazi SS officer at Auschwitz concentration camp executed for war crimes
- Frederico Fritz d'Orey (1938–2020), Brazilian racing driver
- Fritz Dietrich (Nazi) (1898–1948), German Nazi SS officer executed for war crimes
- Siegfried "Fritz" Flesch (1872–1939), Austrian Olympic medalist sabre fencer
- Fritz Salo Glaser (1876–1956), German Jewish lawyer and art collector
- Fritz Haarmann (1879-1925), German serial killer and rapist
- Fritz Haber (1868–1934), German chemist and Nobel Prize winner
- Fritz Haeg (born 1969), American artist
- Fritz Harnest (1905–1999), German painter
- Fritz Hartjenstein (1905–1954), German Nazi SS concentration camp commandant
- Frederick Henderson (born 1958), American executive and CEO of General Motors
- Fritz John (1910–1994), German mathematician
- Fritz Klein (1888–1945), German Nazi doctor hanged for war crimes
- Fritz Knöchlein (1911–1949), German Nazi SS commandant executed for war crimes
- Friedrich Fritz Kreisler (1875–1962), Austrian violinist and composer
- Fritz Julius Kuhn (1896–1951), Nazi who led the German American Bund
- Friedrich Fritz Lang (1890–1976), Austrian-German filmmaker and screenwriter
- Andrzej Frycz Modrzewski, (1503–1572) was a Polish Renaissance scholar, humanist and theologian, called "the father of Polish democracy".
- Fritz Leiber (1910–1992), American fantasy, horror and science fiction author
- Fred Fritz Peterson (1942–2023), American Major League Baseball pitcher
- Fritz Felix Pipes (1887–1983), Austrian Olympic medalist tennis player
- Fritz Pollard (1894–1986), American football player and coach
- Fritz-Georg von Rappard (1892–1946), German Nazi general during World War II executed for war crimes
- Fritz Reichl (1890–1959), Austrian architect
- Fritz Reiner (1888–1963), American conductor, born in Hungary
- Fritz Ritterbusch (1894–1946), German Nazi SS concentration camp commander executed for war crimes
- Fritz Sauckel (1894–1946), German Nazi politician, executed for war crimes
- Fritz Schlieper, German Nazi general during World War II
- Fritz von Scholz, high-ranking member of the Nazi Waffen-SS
- Fritz Steuri (1879–1950), Swiss skier and mountain guide
- Fritz Strobl (born 1972), Austrian World Cup alpine ski racer
- Fritz Suhren (1908–1950), German SS Nazi concentration camp commandant executed for war crimes
- Fritz Walter (1920–2002), German footballer
- Fritz Wepper (1941–2024), German actor
- Fritz Wunderlich (1930–1966), German tenor
- Fritz Zwicky (1898–1974), Swiss astronomer
- Fritz, name given to William S. Hart's show and stunt riding horse

== Nickname, ring name or code name ==
- Fritz, nickname of Walter F. Mondale, Vice President of the United States and U.S. senator from Minnesota
- Friedrich Heinrich Karl "Fritz" Haarmann (1879–1925), prolific and cannibalistic German serial killer, rapist, and fraudster
- Fritz, nickname of Ernest Hollings, Governor of, and U.S. senator from, South Carolina
- Fritz Wetherbee, New Hampshire writer and television host
- Fritz Von Erich (1929–1997), ring name of American professional wrestler and promoter Jack Adkisson
- Fritz or Fritzchen, German code name for Second World War Allied double agent Eddie Chapman

== Fictional characters ==
- Fritz the Cat (comics), an anthropomorphic cat from the comic strip of the same name
- Fritz, Henry Frankenstein's assistant in the 1931 film Frankenstein
- Count Fritz von Tarlenheim, in Anthony Hope's novel The Prisoner of Zenda, its sequel, Rupert of Hentzau, and various film adaptations
- Ymir Fritz, the progenitor (founding) Titan from Attack on Titan and queen of the Eldians
- Friedrich (Fritz) Von Trapp, from The Sound of Music
- Fritz (Ninjago), character from Ninjago
- Fritz, the name for a doll in the story "Fritz" by Satyajit Ray.
- Fritz, Dr Schultz's horse in Django Unchained
- Fritz, Clara's brother in The Nutcracker
- Fritz, a blue Atlantic dolphin calf and Marina's best friend in Hans Christian Andersen's The Little Mermaid
- Fritz, one of the missing children from Five Nights at Freddy's
- Fritz Smith, protagonist of the 7th and final night in Five Nights at Freddy's 2
- Fritz Howard, FBI Special Agent from The Closer and later Deputy Chief of the LAPD Special Operations Bureau in Major Crimes

== See also ==
- Fritz, a chess program
- Fritz, elephant owned by House of Savoy
- Frits, another given name
- Frit, a ceramic composition
