= Frederic Hsieh =

Chinese-born American realtor and investor

Frederic Shu Kong Hsieh (Chinese: 謝樹剛; pinyin: Xiè Shùgāng, March 1, 1945–August 8, 1999) was a Chinese-born American realtor and investor who "founded" the first Chinese American suburban community of Monterey Park, California by purchasing and reselling plots of abandoned land in the city at premium prices to Chinese investors from Taiwan. In addition, he heavily promoted Monterey Park in newspapers of Hong Kong and Taiwan to encourage prospective Chinese emigrants to move to the city. In the early 1970s, he predicted that the then-predominantly Caucasian city of Monterey Park and the San Gabriel Valley would serve as an anchor for new ethnic Chinese immigrants as an alternative to the old Chinatown in Los Angeles, but it was immediately dismissed and brushed off as mere speculation at the time.

However, his prophetic words came true as many Hong Kong and Taiwanese immigrant elite and poverty-stricken ethnic Chinese refugees from Vietnam alike began settling in Monterey Park and in nearby Alhambra, Rosemead, and San Gabriel, California. Additionally, many immigrants from mainland China, who would have settled to traditional immigrant points such as San Francisco or New York City, have also arrived to Monterey Park and other parts of the San Gabriel Valley due to the work of Hsieh. Wealthier immigrants have since moved onto San Marino (an expensive neighborhood) in large numbers during the 1980s and eventually in other communities such as Walnut and Rowland Heights thus giving rise to new suburban Chinatown areas in the Los Angeles. By the 1980s, for the first time in US history, Monterey Park became the first suburban city with an Asian American majority population. Hence, Hsieh is generally credited for leading the way to Chinese immigration in the Greater Los Angeles area. This process initiated a wave of some "white flight" from then white-bread communities.

He owned and operated the prominent Chinese American realty company, Mandarin Realty, which still operates in Monterey Park. As a developer, entrepreneur, he was also a community activist. He left a historic mark on the city of Monterey Park and the entire region.

Hsieh died while visiting Las Vegas in 1999.
