= Federico Mociulsky =

Argentine footballer

Personal information
- Full name: Federico Mociulsky
- Date of birth: 15 July 1989 (age 37)
- Place of birth: Buenos Aires, Argentina
- Height: 1.71 m (5 ft 7 1/2 in)
- Position: Midfielder

Team information
- Current team: Deportivo Roca

Youth career
- Ferro Carril Oeste
- 2004–2007: Club Atlético Atlanta

Senior career*
Years	Team	Apps	(Gls)
2007–	Club Atlético Atlanta	19	(1)
Total		19	(1)
- * Club domestic league appearances and goals

Federico Mociulsky (born 15 July 1989 in Buenos Aires) is an Argentine professional association football player contracted to Deportivo Roca.

== Early life ==
Mociulsky's paternal grandfather, Leon, was part owner of the club in 1958. His uncle, Dr. Ernesto Mociulsky, was also a stockholder in the club during the 1980s.

== Professional career ==
Nicknamed "The Russian", Mociulky was promoted to the first team for training in 2007.

In 2011, he left Argentina and joined Hapoel Ashkelon in Israel on trial. Being Jewish, Mociulky would not count as a foreign player in Israel. His trial was unsuccessful at Ashkelon, so he went to Hapoel Ra'anana in hopes of securing a contract. Actually, he plays in Deportivo Roca.
