= Frédéric Fromet =

French chansonnier (born 1971)

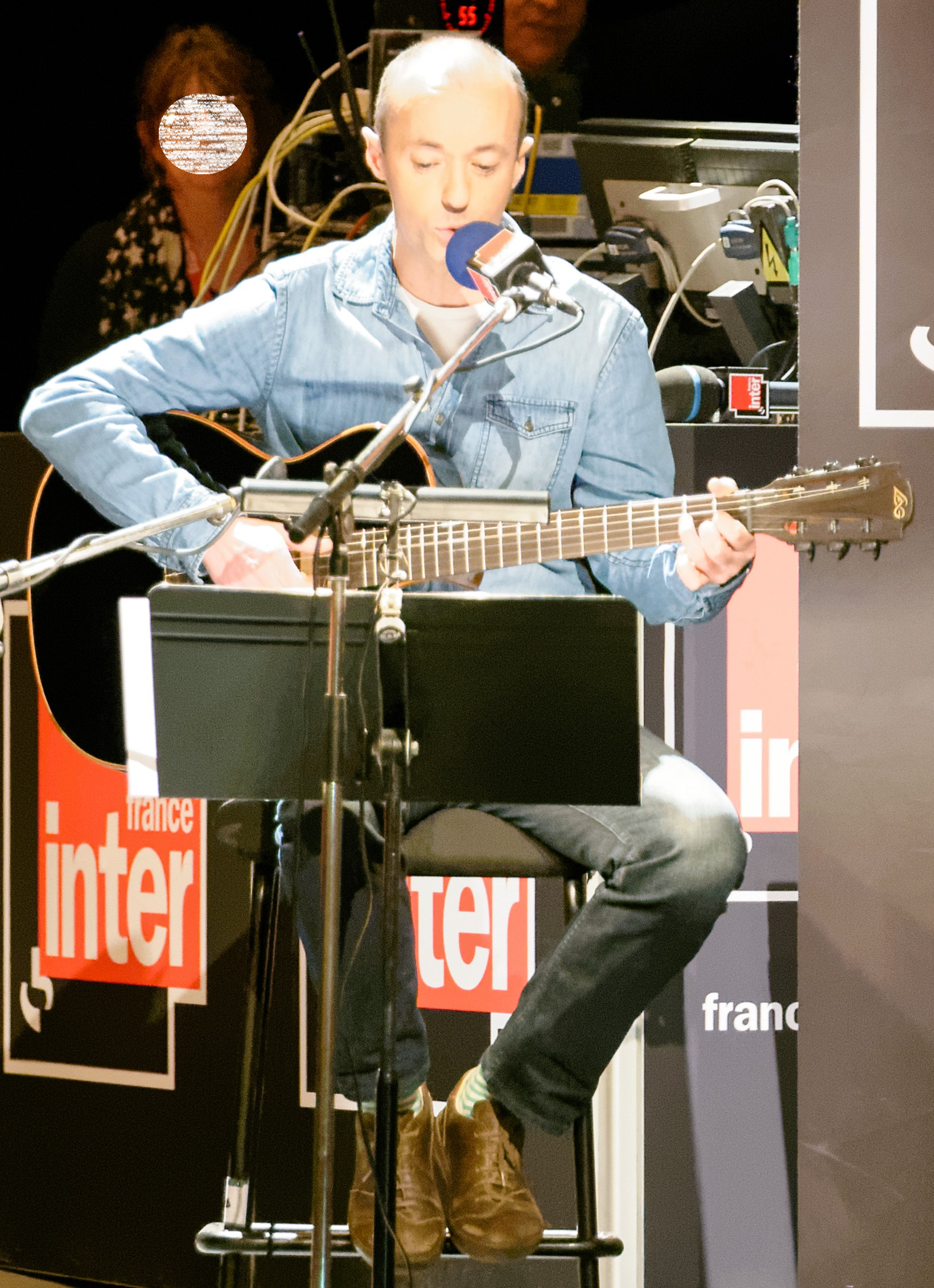
- Frédéric Fromet during the public recording of the show Par Jupiter !|If You Listen, I’ll Cancel Everything in Dijon in 23 April.
- Born: July 17, 1971 (age 54); Loir-et-Cher, France
- Website: fredericfromet.fr

Frédéric Fromet (born July 17, 1971 in Loir-et-Cher, France) is a French chansonnier. He is particularly known for his participation in the radio show Par Jupiter ! (formerly titled If You Listen, I'll Cancel Everything) on the French radio France Inter, where he performs humorous songs, often addressing current events and frequently adapting pre-existing melodies. Some of his songs have sparked controversies.

== Career ==
According to Le Journal du Centre, after studying computer engineering and working in that field (in financial management) for about ten years without enjoying it, Frédéric Fromet began writing songs.

His first album Chansons vaches mais vachement bien was released in 2003, followed by a second in 2008, Quand la terre sera mourue! That same year, during his second participation in the Festival Off d'Avignon, he was noticed by Hugues Le Forestier, director of the Caveau de la République, where he later performed regularly from January 2009 until 2014. It was in this venue that he met Alex Vizorek, who invited him to perform on a show he was part of on France Inter, Septante-cinq minutes. Their collaboration continued with Par Jupiter ! (then titled If You Listen, I'll Cancel Everything) where Fromet appeared every Friday. He also occasionally contributed to other France Inter programs, such as the morning show hosted by Patrick Cohen.

Alongside his radio work, he continues to perform on stage, accompanied by François Marnier (keyboard, accordion, backing vocals) and Rémy Chatton (double bass, backing vocals) as well as Clarisse Catarino. In 2015, he recorded an album with the Ogres de Barback, whom he had met a few years earlier and who had invited him to perform at their 20th anniversary show. The album was released on 6 November 2015 under the Irfan label, with cover art by Aurel. The magazine FrancoFans ranked this album second on its list of the best records of 2015.

He launched his tour on his latest album in 2015, and simultaneously performed weekly at the Comédie de Paris until 24 May 2017.

== Recent activities (2024–2025) ==
In 2024 and 2025, Frédéric Fromet continued his work as a chansonnier on France Inter, particularly within the radio program Par Jupiter !. He maintained his characteristic satirical style, regularly writing and performing songs addressing social and political issues.

In April 2024, Fromet released a song titled “Quand t’es dans le désert (médical)”, a parody of Jean-Patrick Capdevielle's "Quand t'es dans le désert", focusing on the increasing lack of access to healthcare in rural France. The song humorously critiqued self-medication, long waits for appointments, and the challenges of medical deserts.

== Controversies ==
=== Death of a Matador ===
In June 2017, the broadcast of a song mocking the death of matador Iván Fandiño led to a complaint being filed with the Conseil supérieur de l'audiovisuel (CSA) by the Union des villes taurines françaises (UVTF) and the Observatoire national des cultures taurines (ONCT). The CSA did not take any action, finding that the broadcast did not breach current regulations.
