= Freddy (weather) =

Animated weatherman shown in TV weather reports

Freddy, officially Freddy Forecaster, is an animated weatherman shown in TV weather reports. Freddy depicts twenty different weather conditions, complete with sound effects, and appears on various networks such as the TVB channel in Hong Kong. Freddy was created by Fairman Productions in Milwaukee, Wisconsin, which syndicates the program.

== Appearance ==
Freddy wears a yellow suit and has a pink face; his design has not generally changed over the years.

== Freddy and the weather ==
Freddy's actions gives a short forecast of the day's weather:

- For weather is clear, the sun appears, and a flower sprouts in front of Freddy. He picks the flower, whistles happily, and continues on his way.
- For sun is shining brightly, the sun appears, and Freddy puts on his sunglasses and says, "Yay!"
- For mostly sunny, clouds drift by, and Freddy first says, "Oh!" Then the sun appears, and Freddy says, "Yay!" The clouds drift away, and he happily continues on his way.
- For mostly cloudy, the sun appears, and Freddy puts on his sunglasses and says, "Yay!" Then dark clouds drift by, the sun disappears, and Freddy takes off his sunglasses and says, "Oh!" But when the dark clouds return, he walks on unhappily again.
- For cloudy, large amounts of clouds drift by, and the sky becomes overcast. Freddy says, "Oh!" and continues on his way.
- For cloudy and drop of water, clouds drift in. Freddy opens his umbrella to shield himself from the rain. A single drop of rain falls from the clouds. After he puts the umbrella back on, the clouds move away and continue on their way.
- For showers, rain clouds drift in and block the sun. Freddy then starts a downpour. After the rain clouds move away, the sun returns.
- For light rain, rain clouds drift in and start a light drizzle. Freddy moves on.
- For rain, rain clouds drift in and start a rain. Freddy moves on.
- For heavy rain, heavy rain falls, and Freddy experiences severe flooding.
- For thunderstorm, thunderclouds drift in. A panicked Freddy jumps up and down with lightning. He is then struck by lightning on his backside and runs away as fast as he can, but the thunderclouds drift away.
- For windy, Freddy is blown up by the strong wind, taking off his shirt and pants. He twists and turns, being blown into the sky and carried away.
- For fog, a thick fog drifts in. Freddy takes out his oil lamp for light and sounds his ship's horn. After the fog clears, he continues on his way.
- For hot, the sun appears, and Freddy melts under its heat.
- For rises temp, Freddy is pressed up by the word "TEMP".
- For drops temp, Freddy is pressed down by the word "TEMP".
- For cold, an ice monster appears in the sky and blows on Freddy, freezing him into ice until he lies horizontally. Then, Freddy retreats.
- For snows, snow clouds drift in, and Freddy is quickly covered in snow, becoming a snowman. After the snow clouds disperse, he continues on his way.
- For haze and pollen, haze and pollen drift in. Freddy coughs, makes popping sounds, and groans. After the haze and pollen disperse, he continues on his way.

The animations feature various sound effects, such as falling rain, thunder, blowing wind, footsteps, and Freddy's whistling and reactive cries such as "oooh", "aaah" and "awww".

== Other markets ==
Freddy (also known as "Freddy Forecast" or "Freddy the Forecaster") has been shown in 19 television markets in the United States, such as KTVO TV in Kirksville, Missouri, WJBF in Augusta, Georgia and many other stations. The series also ran in Perth, Australia for many years. In 1982, a program director at KNOE-TV in Monroe, Louisiana said that Freddy was "the best thing we’ve ever done" for weather reports because it had successfully gotten more kids to watch, and that the station planned to "keep Freddy around until he’s a great-grandfather."

In Shenzhen, China, Shenzhen Television's news bulletin at noon uses a similar character and features Shenzhen's skyline in the background.

=== Hong Kong (TVB) ===
Freddy moaning "Ooooh" because he cannot take a photo of birds on a cloudy day

3D Freddy starting March 31, 2009

In Hong Kong, where Freddy is known as (Chinese: 天氣先生; lit. 'Mr. Weather') in Cantonese and Mandarin, the character is utilised on TVB's weather forecasts, for both its English (TVB Pearl) and Chinese (TVB Jade) channels. In 1993, he became computer-animated.

The skyline behind him on TVB's broadcasts is regularly updated to keep abreast of the ever-changing skyline of Hong Kong. It appears as if he is walking on the water surface of Victoria Harbour. As of January 2008, Freddy was upgraded to his third incarnation.

During the 1980s weather reports, in case of fine weather Freddy would pick flowers, which was criticised as an example of destroying public property. After receiving complaints, TVB changed this in the 1990s to him walking and whistling merrily.

Starting March 31, 2009, Freddy transitioned from 2D to 3D animation. While Freddy's image has remained largely unchanged over the years, the cityscape behind him is continuously updated to reflect Hong Kong's ever-changing landscape.

From November 19, 2025, TVB will add "Weather Boy" and "Weather Dog" to the Weather Family, joining Freddy to provide weather forecasts for viewers.
