= Federico Bongioanni =

Argentine football midfielder

Personal information
- Full name: Federico Alejandro Bongioanni
- Date of birth: November 6, 1978 (age 47)
- Place of birth: Córdoba, Argentina
- Height: 1.70 m (5 ft 7 in)
- Position: Winger

Team information
- Current team: General Paz Juniors

Senior career*
Years	Team	Apps	(Gls)
2001–2002	Instituto Córdoba	30	(10)
2002–2004	Huachipato	82	(17)
2005	Universidad de Concepción	27	(2)
2006	Aucas	7	(0)
2006–2007	Talleres de Córdoba	13	(1)
2007	Deportes Concepción	9	(0)
2008–2009	Aurora	21	(6)
2009	Deportivo Anzoátegui		
2010	Central Norte		
2010–	General Paz Juniors		
- * Club domestic league appearances and goals as of July 6, 2009

Federico Alejandro Bongioanni (born November 6, 1978, in Córdoba) is an Argentine football winger who plays for General Paz Juniors in the Torneo Argentino B.

Bongioanni began his career at Instituto Córdoba in 2001. He also played in Argentina for Talleres de Córdoba later in his career. He went abroad to play in Chile for Huachipato, U. de Concepción and Deportes Concepción. In addition, he had a short spell in Ecuador with club Aucas. In 2008 Bongioanni signed with Bolivian club Aurora, helping the team win the Clausura tournament.

== Honours ==
Aurora

- Bolivian Primera División (1): 2008
