= Federico Bessone (footballer, born 1972) =

Argentine footballer

Personal information
- Date of birth: 19 December 1972 (age 53)
- Place of birth: Córdoba, Argentina
- Height: 1.82 m (6 ft 0 in)
- Position: Defender

Senior career*
Years	Team	Apps	(Gls)
1990–1995	Instituto	105	(8)
1995–1997	Belgrano	38	(1)
1997–1999	Godoy Cruz	44	(1)
1999	Coquimbo Unido		
2000–2001	FC Gueugnon	29	(3)
2002	Bristol Rovers		
2003	Universitario de Córdoba	4	(0)
- * Club domestic league appearances and goals

Federico Bessone (born 19 December 1972 in Córdoba, Argentina) is an Argentine former professional footballer who played as a defender for clubs of Argentina, Chile, England, France and Italy.

== Teams ==
- Instituto de Córdoba 1990–1995
- Belgrano de Córdoba 1995–1997
- Godoy Cruz de Mendoza 1997–1999
- Coquimbo Unido 1999
- FC Gueugnon 2000–2001
- Bristol Rovers 2002
