= Priidu =

Male given name

- Gender: Male
- Language: Estonian
- Name day: 5 September

Origin
- Region of origin: Estonia

Other names
- Related names: Priit

Priidu is an Estonian masculine given name.

Notable individuals named Priidu include:

- Priidu Aavik (1905–1991), painter
- Priidu Beier (born 1957), poet and teacher
- Priidu Isak (born 1957), boxer (et)
- Priidu Niit (born 1990), discus thrower (et)
- Priidu Puusepp (1887–1972), Estonian educator and linguist
