= Fredy (song) =

Single by Eartha Kitt and Pérez Prado
- B-side: "Sweet and Gentle (Me lo dijo Adela)"
- Released: 1955
- Label: RCA Victor
- Composer: Peter Pan

"Fredy" is a song written by Peter Kreuder (under the pseudonym Peter Pan), Steve Kirk, and Sheldon Harnick. It was recorded in 1955 by Eartha Kitt with Pérez Prado for RCA Victor and, under the title "Freddy", by Connie Francis for MGM Records (MGM 12015, c/w "Didn't I Love You Enough?").

== Composition ==
It is a tango.

== Connie Francis version ==
"Freddy"

Single by Connie Francis
- B-side: "Didn't I Love You Enough?"
- Released: 1955
- Genre: Pop
- Label: MGM

Connie Francis US singles chronology
"Freddy" (1955)	"(Oh Please) Make Him Jealous" / "Goody Goodbye" (1955)

Audio
- "Freddy" on YouTube

It was Connie Francis's debut single on MGM. It went largely unnoticed.

According to the singer's autobiography, Who's Sorry Now?, the song was the reason why MGM Records signed her in the first place. She recorded it in 1955, together with three other songs, as a demo – at a recording session that Francis's manager George Scheck arranged and paid for in the hope to pitch her to a top-tier record label. Virtually every recording company had already rejected, when Harry A. Meyerson of MGM Records decided that the song titled "Freddy" would be a good birthday gift to his son Freddy.

== German version ==
Annie Cordy recorded it for Electrola Ges. m.b.H., with a German text by Gisela Günther.

== Charts ==
Connie Francis version

Chart (1955)	Peak position
US Music Vendor	53
