= Federico Capece =

Argentine footballer

Personal information
- Full name: Federico Martín Capece
- Date of birth: February 19, 1976 (age 50)
- Place of birth: Buenos Aires, Argentina
- Height: 1.66 m (5 ft 5 in)
- Position: Midfielder

Senior career*
Years	Team	Apps	(Gls)
1994–1997	All Boys	-	
1997–1998	Atlanta	-	
1998–1999	Almirante Brown	-	
1999–2000	Comunicaciones	-	
2000–2001	Tigre	-	
2001–2002	Casarano	21	(0)
2002–2003	Gallipoli	-	
2003–2006	Peralta	79	(3)
2006–2007	Val di Sangro	31	(0)
2007–2009	San Marino Calcio	62	(2)
- * Club domestic league appearances and goals

Federico Capece (born 19 February 1976) is an Argentine footballer who plays as a midfielder. He is currently unattached.

== See also ==
- Football in Argentina
- List of football clubs in Argentina
