= Freddy =

Freddie or Freddy may refer to:

== Entertainment ==
- Freddy (comic strip), a newspaper comic strip which ran from 1955 to 1980
- Freddie (Cromartie), a character from the Japanese manga series Cromartie High School
- Freddie (dance), a short-lived 1960s dance fad
- Freddy (franchise), a franchise that began with A Nightmare on Elm Street
  - Freddy Krueger, a character from the franchise
- Freddie (TV series), a sitcom created by Freddie Prinze, Jr.
- Freddy Fazbear, the titular character of Five Nights at Freddy's
- Freddy (film), a 2022 Indian film starring Kartik Aaryan
- Freddie (What We Do in the Shadows), an episode of the TV series What We Do in the Shadows

=== Album ===
- Freddie (album), a 2018 album by Freddie Gibbs

=== Songs ===
- "Fredy" (song) (also recorded as "Freddy"), a 1955 song
- "Freddy", a 2019 song by British rapper Fredo

== People ==
- Freddy (given name), a list of people with Freddy or Freddie as a given name or nickname
- Freddie (cricketer), English cricketer and TV personality
- Freddie (singer) (born 1990), Hungarian singer
- Freddy (Angolan footballer) (born 1979)
- Fredesvinda García (1935–1961), Cuban singer known as Freddy

== Other uses ==
- Freddy (dog), a Great Dane known for being the world's tallest dog
- Freddy (weather), an animated weatherman
- Freddy's Frozen Custard & Steakburgers, an American fast-casual restaurant
- Atari FREDDIE, a custom chip found in some later Atari 8-bit computers
- Freddy (1969–1971) and Freddy II (1973–1976), experimental robots built at the University of Edinburgh
- Cyclone Freddy, The longest-lived tropical cyclone recorded worldwide.

== See also ==
- Freddie Mac, a government-sponsored enterprise of the US federal government, authorized to make loans and loan guarantees
- Fast Freddie (disambiguation), a list of people with the nickname and a video game
- Fred (disambiguation)
