= Fredro =

Fredro is a surname or given name. It may refer to:

- Aleksander Fredro (1793–1876), Polish poet, playwright, and writer
- Andrzej Maksymilian Fredro (1620–1679), Polish nobleman
- Fredro Starr, rapper

== See also ==
- Fredro (Bończa), Polish noble family of Bończa coat of arms
