= Friedrich =

Friedrich may refer to:

== Names ==
- Friedrich (given name), people with the male given name Friedrich
- Friedrich (surname), people with the surname Friedrich

== Other ==
- Friedrich (board game), a board game about Frederick the Great and the Seven Years' War
- Friedrich (novel), a novel about anti-semitism written by Hans Peter Richter
- Friedrich Air Conditioning, a company manufacturing air conditioning and purifying products
- SS Friedrich, a German cargo ship in service 1941-45

== See also ==
- Friedrichs (disambiguation)
- Frederick (disambiguation)
- Nikolaus Friedreich
