= Fred =

Fred, fred, or FRED may refer to:

== People and fictional characters ==
- Fred (given name), including a list of people and characters with the name
- Fred (surname), a list of people

=== Mononym ===
- Fred (cartoonist) (1931–2013), pen name of Fred Othon Aristidès, French
- Fred (footballer, born 1949) (1949–2022), Frederico Rodrigues de Oliveira, Brazilian
- Fred (footballer, born 1979), Helbert Frederico Carreiro da Silva, Brazilian
- Fred (footballer, born 1983), Frederico Chaves Guedes, Brazilian
- Fred (footballer, born 1986), Frederico Burgel Xavier, Brazilian
- Fred (footballer, born 1993), Frederico Rodrigues de Paula Santos, Brazilian
- Fred Again (born 1993), British songwriter known as FRED

== Television and movies ==
- Fred (2014 film), a 2014 documentary film
- Fred (franchise), a Nickelodeon media franchise based on the Fred Figglehorn character created by Lucas Cruikshank
- Fred: The Movie, a 2010 independent comedy film
- Fred the Caveman, French Teletoon production from 2002

== Animals ==
- Fred (baboon), a notorious car raider from Cape Town, South Africa
- Fred the Undercover Kitty, an undercover cat working for the New York Police Department
- Fred la marmotte, official groundhog of Quebec, Canada
- Fred, also known as Monster Pig, a giant pig that was shot in 2007 by an 11-year-old boy

== Music ==
- Fred (band), an Irish alternative band
- Fred (quartet), a barbershop quartet
- Fred Records, a record label
- "Fred", a song from Yer' Album by James Gang
- "Fred", a song from 2525 (Exordium & Terminus) by Zager & Evans

== Companies ==
- Fred (restaurant), Rotterdam, Netherlands
- Fred's, a chain of American retail stores
- Fred's Frozen Foods, US

== Places ==
- Fred, Louisiana, US
- Fred, Texas, US

== Other uses ==
- Fred (XM), channel 44 on XM Satellite Radio prior to 2008
- Fred (chatterbot), an acronym for Functional Response Emulation Device
- Fred Defence, a chess gambit
- Fred the Computer, at the Middlesex News, a U.S. newspaper on the Internet
- Fast Recovery Epitaxial Diode, FRED
- Fred the Red, the Manchester United F.C. mascot since 1994
- Tropical Storm Fred (disambiguation)
- FRED, a computer language integrated into the Framework (office suite)
- FRED (text editor)
- Fred Optical Engineering Software
- Federal Reserve Economic Data, a database maintained by the research division of the Federal Reserve Bank of St. Louis
- Fred, nickname for Lockheed C-5 Galaxy aircraft
- End-of-train device, a.k.a. Flashing Rear End Device (FRED)
- Fredericksburg Regional Transit, Virginia, US
- Field Ration Eating Device, an Australian Army knife/spoon/etc. combination
- Forum for Renewable Energy Development in Scotland (FREDS)

== See also ==
- Frede (disambiguation)
- Freddy (disambiguation)
- Ferd (disambiguation)
