= Frick (surname) =

Frick is a German shortening of the surname "Frederick". Notable people with the surname include:

- Albert Frick (theologian) (1714–1776), German theologian
- Albert Frick (politician) (born 1948), Liechtenstein politician
- Albert Frick (skier) (born 1949), Liechtenstein Olympic alpine skier
- Alexander Frick (1910–1991), head of government of Liechtenstein
- Arnold Frick (born 1966), Liechtenstein judoka
- Aurelia Frick (born 1975), Liechtenstein government minister
- Benjamin Frick (1796–1871), American politician from Pennsylvania
- Bruno Frick (born 1953), Swiss politician
- Carl Frick (1863–1924), Swedish sea captain, corporation leader
- Charles Frick (1823–1860), US physician
- Childs Frick (1883–1965), US vertebrate paleontologist
- Davy Frick (born 1990), German athlete in football
- Denise Frick (born 1980), South African chess player
- Ebbe Frick (fl. 1950s), Swedish athlete in sprint canoe
- Ernst Frick (footballer), Swiss athlete in 1934 FIFA World Cup of Football
- Ernst Frick (painter) (1881–1956), Swiss artist
- Ferdinand Frick (1878–1939), Austrian sculptor
- Flora Frick (1889–1957), American physical educator and playwright
- Ford Frick (1894–1978), US sportswriter, sports manager
- Frick and Frack, stage name of two Swiss skaters who moved to US in 1937: Werner Groebli (1915–2008); Hansruedi Mauch, (1919–1979)
- Gottlob Frick (1906–1994), German singer
- Hansjörg Frick (born 1943), Liechtenstein politician
- Henry Frick (politician) (1795–1844), US political figure
- Henry Clay Frick (1849–1919), US industrialist, financier, art patron
- Henry Clay Frick II (1919–2007), US physician and professor of medicine
- Helen Clay Frick (1888–1984), US philanthropist
- Jacob Gellert Frick (1825–1902), US Civil War Union officer
- Jim Frick (1951–2020), Swedish horse harness racer
- John Frick (1939–2021), professionally known as Mark Elliott, US voice-over artist
- Karin Frick (born 1980), Swedish sports journalist and television presenter
- Mario Frick (politician) (born 1965), Liechtenstein political figure
- Mario Frick (footballer) (born 1974), Swiss-born athlete in Liechtenstein football
- Ola Frick, Swedish musician, of the duo Moonbabies
- Per Frick (born 1992), Swedish athlete in football
- Peter Frick (born 1965), Liechtenstein politician
- Rolf Frick (1936–2008), German professor, political figure
- Sarah Viktoria Frick (born 1982), Swiss actress
- Stephen Frick (born 1964), US astronaut
- Tim Frick (born 1952), Canadian wheelchair basketball coach
- Vaughn Frick (fl. 1980s–present), US cartoonist
- Walter Frick (born 1956), Liechtenstein politician
- Wilhelm Frick (1877–1946), German Nazi official, executed for war crimes
- William Frick (born 1974), US political figure
- William Frick (1790–1855), justice of the Maryland Court of Appeals
- Xaver Frick (1913–2009), Liechtenstein Olympic athlete
- Yanik Frick (born 1998), Liechtenstein athlete in football
