= Ernst Frick =

Ernst Frick may refer to:

- Ernst Frick (painter) (1881–1956), Swiss painter
- Ernst Frick (footballer), Swiss footballer
