= Rängs sand =

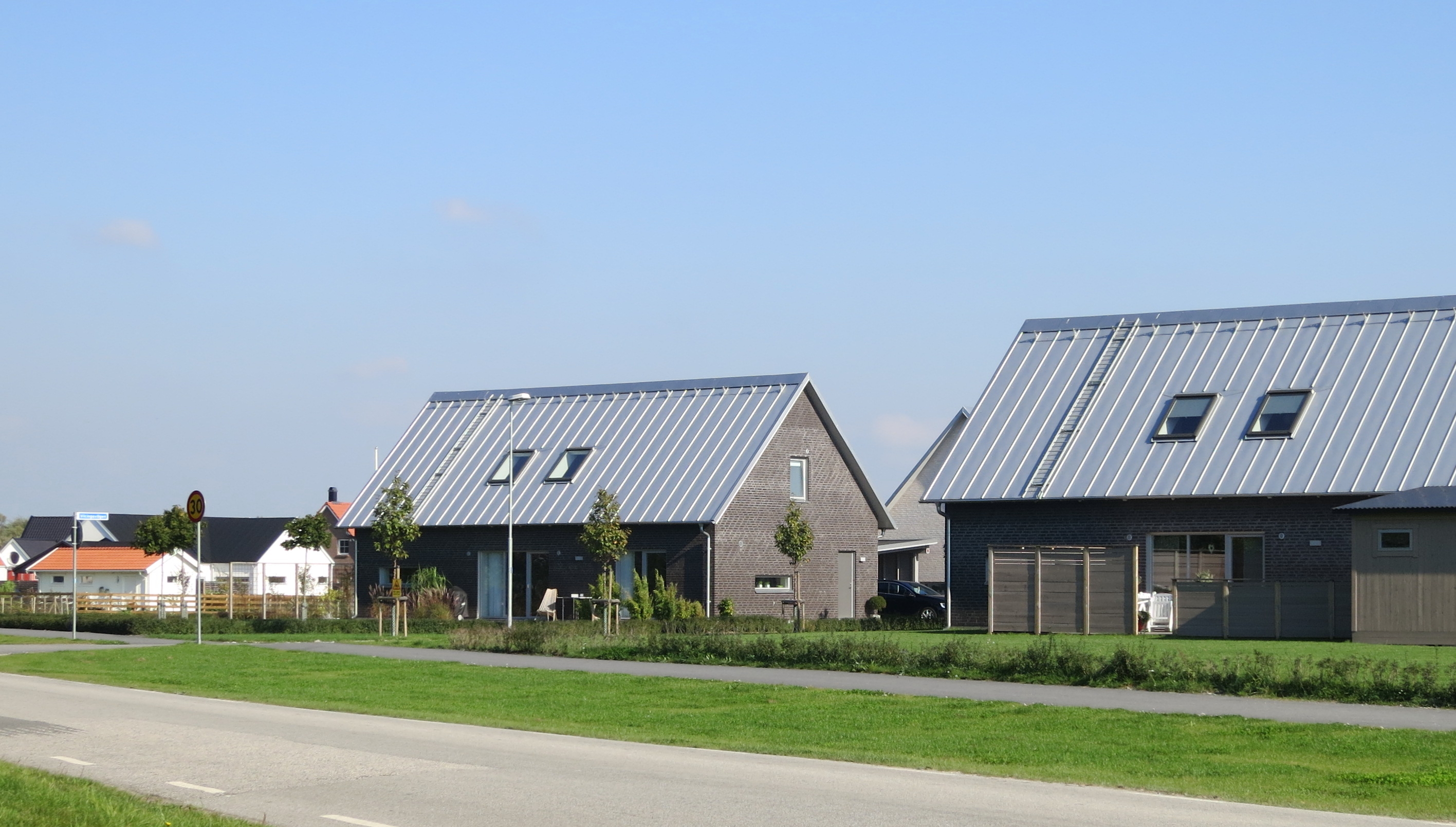

- Location within Skåne Location within Sweden
- Coordinates: 55°25′N 13°00′E
- Country: Sweden
- Province: Skåne
- County: Skåne County
- Municipality: Vellinge Municipality

Area
  - Total: 0.56 km^{2} (0.22 sq mi)

Population (31 December 2010)
  - Total: 808
  - Density: 1,451/km^{2} (3,760/sq mi)
- Time zone: UTC+1 (CET)
  - Summer (DST): UTC+2 (CEST)

Rängs sand is a locality situated in Vellinge Municipality, Skåne County, Sweden with 808 inhabitants in 2010.
