= Hököpinge =

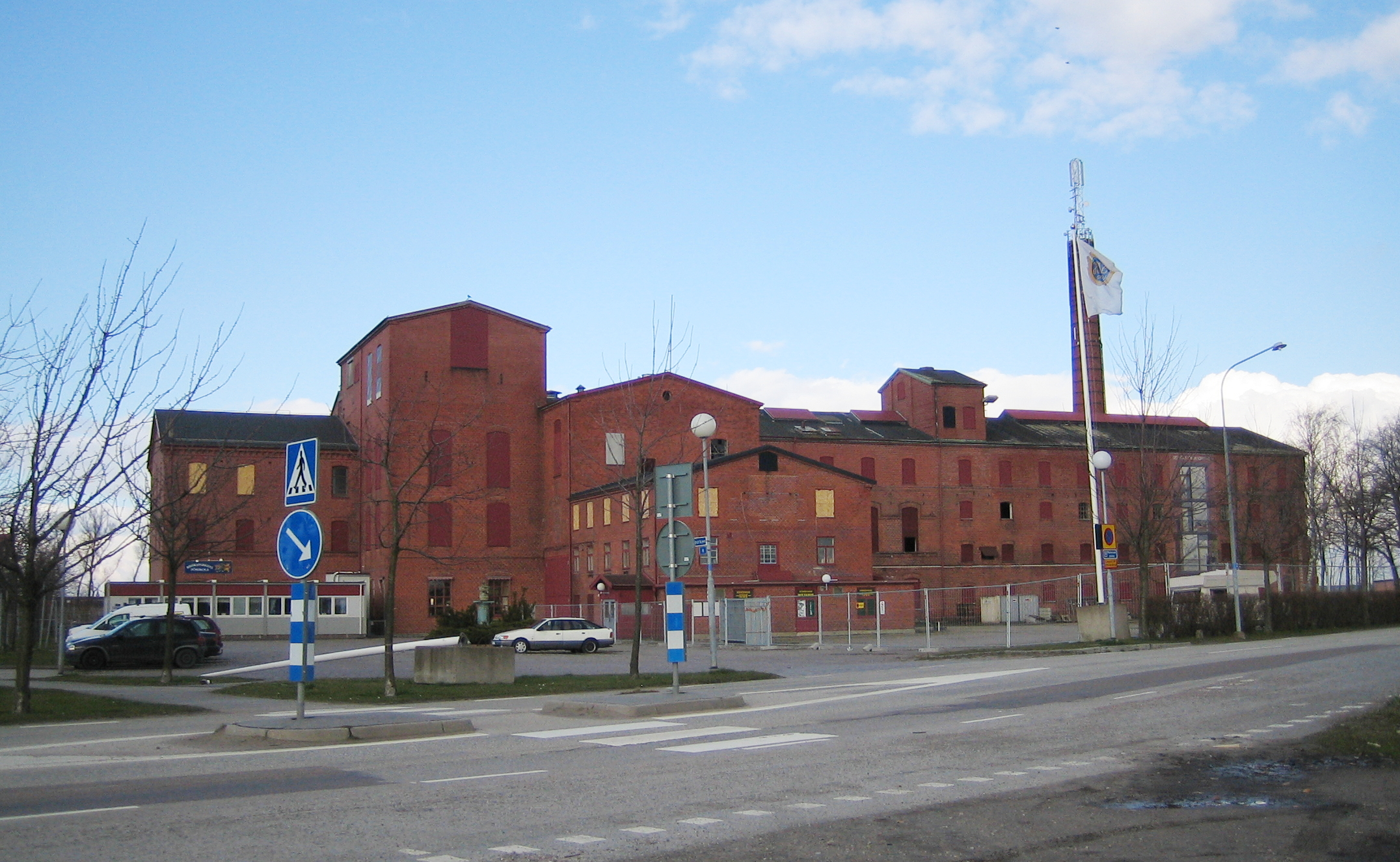

- Location within Skåne Location within Sweden
- Coordinates: 55°29′N 13°01′E
- Country: Sweden
- Province: Skåne
- County: Skåne County
- Municipality: Vellinge Municipality

Area
  - Total: 0.66 km^{2} (0.25 sq mi)

Population (31 December 2010)
  - Total: 1,105
  - Density: 1,676/km^{2} (4,340/sq mi)
- Time zone: UTC+1 (CET)
  - Summer (DST): UTC+2 (CEST)

Hököpinge is a locality situated in Vellinge Municipality, Skåne County, Sweden with 1,105 inhabitants in 2010. It lies about 2 km north of Vellinge.

The village contains mostly older buildings along small roads. However, in the village's outer reach there are newly built four-storey buildings in "factory style" at the former factory.

In 2017, a new plan for about 100 homes, a primary school and a shop has been approved.

== History ==
Researchers believe that around the 12th century this was a marketplace, mainly because of its position. Hököpinge is located close to the sea and was well protected against wars inland, an ideal place for a marketplace.

The name Hököpinge comes from the Old Norse word Haukrs, which means "marketplace". In 1346 the name was spelled Hököpingel, in 1479 Hökiobinge and in 1567 Höykiöpinge.

The main road that went between the two larger cities Malmö and Trelleborg went by Hököpinge and not by Vellinge. This stresses the importance of Hököpinge's role in trading.

== Recent history ==
On 11 November 2009 it was revealed that Vellinge Municipality would have the municipalities' first lodging for refugee children set up in a hostel in Hököpinge. The lodging for the refugee children was set up by the private company, Attendo Care, commissioned by Malmö Municipality. This was opposed by many politicians in Vellinge Municipality, claiming support of the inhabitants of Hököpinge. Vellinge hasn't accepted refugees before this.
