= Karin Frick =

Swedish sports journalist and television presenter

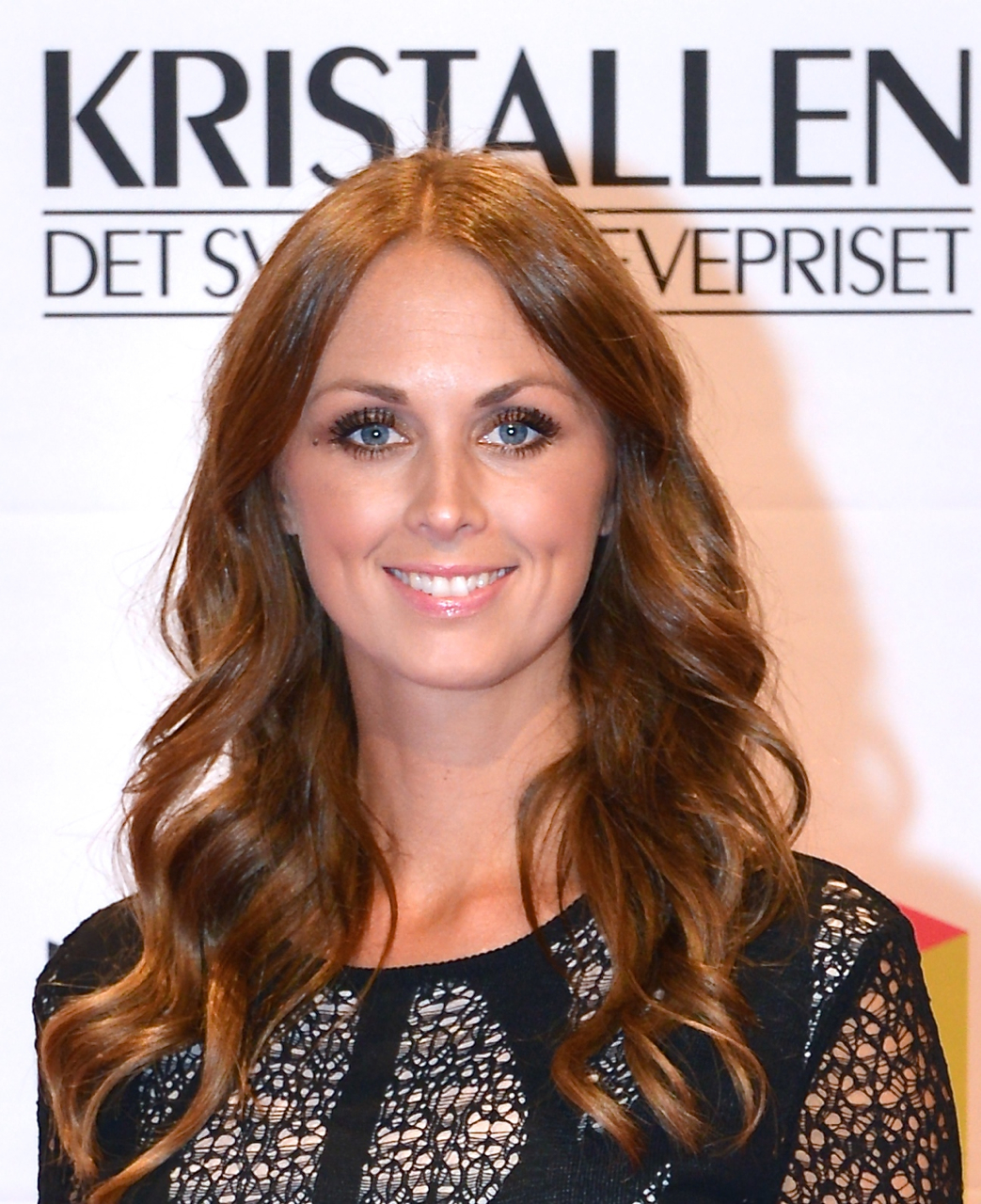
- Karin Frick during the Kristallen Awards in August 2013.
- Born: Karin Anna Maria Frick; 24 March 1980 (age 46); Jönköping, Sweden
- Occupation: Television presenter
- Known for: Sports programmes

Karin Anna Maria Frick (born 24 March 1980) is a Swedish sports journalist and television presenter at Kanal 5 and TV4.

== Biography ==
Frick grew up in Hovslätt outside of Jönköping, Sweden. She had an interest in sports since an early age and participated in several, including tennis. In Sweden she was ranked in the Top 10 of the best women in tennis in her age group. She won a scholarship, which she used to play tennis at a college in Miami, Florida. After a year at the college, she returned to Sweden and changed direction in her life. Journalism became an interest and she applied to Kaggeholms folkhögskola and their course in journalism with an emphasis on television production.

Between 2005 and 2007, she worked as a presenter and reporter for Sport-Expressen's television station. After that, she worked as a presenter for TV4 Sport and Nyhetsmorgon for seven years. In 2014 she moved to SBS Discovery Media to become the face of Kanal 5's new sports programmes. She presents sports shows on Kanal 5, Kanal 9 and Eurosport.

Besides presenting television programmes, she and her co-presenters Anna Brolin, Maud Bernhagen and Suzanne Sjögren produce the podcast "Off Air", a project which describes "behind the scenes" at TV4. She also owns and runs a company called Karin Frick AB as a moderator and conferencier. In August 2014, Frick was a guest in the podcast called Agendasättarna presented by Anders Cedhamre. In the podcast she talked about the sport broadcasts that she presents, and why she chose to leave TV4. In September 2015, Frick and David Sundin presented the ”Barncancergalan – det svenska humorpriset” (Child cancer gala – The Swedish comedian awards) an award show which celebrates comedian achievements and also raises the issue of child cancer. It which was broadcast on Kanal5 and Aftonbladets website. In the summer of 2015 she presented the web-TV broadcast Sommarkväll i Gränna hamn, live from Gränna. Frick is married, has two children, and lives in Stockholm.
