= Fredrik (band) =

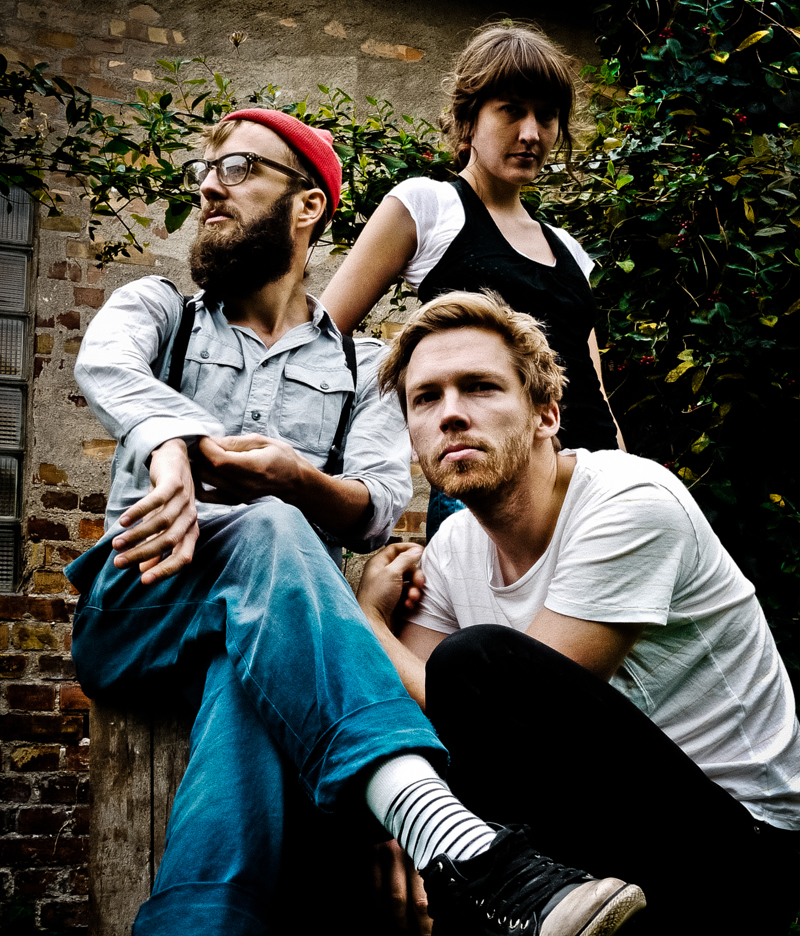

Background information
- Origin: Malmö, Sweden
- Genres: Indie folk, baroque pop, folk rock, alternative rock, progressive rock, electronica, experimental
- Instrument(s): Vocals, guitar, bass guitar, banjo, alto horn, piano, cello, clarinet, drums
- Years active: 2008–2016
- Labels: The Kora Records, Biograf
- Past members: Fredrik Hultin; Ola Lindefelt; Anna Moberg

Fredrik was a Swedish indie band from Malmö, Sweden. Its members were Fredrik Hultin, Ola Lindefelt, and Anna Moberg.

== History ==
Fredrik started as a side project of The LK, an electronic music duo that consisted of Hultin and Lindefelt.

Fredrik released three albums starting with their debut in 2008, Na Na Ni, which received critical acclaim from Magnet Magazine and Stereogum. Following the release of Na Na Ni, Stereogum featured them as a "Band to Watch" and brought them to the United States for the first time. Their second album, Trilogi, was released in March 2010, and was accompanied by a tour of Europe and the eastern United States, including a live performance on the NPR Tiny Desk Concerts series. Their third and final album, Flora, was released on 29 March 2011. Their music features sounds from folk, electronica, and symphonic instrumentation. All of their songs were recorded in their private garden studio.

The band produced multiple music videos for each release, many of which feature stop-motion animation.

Their music has been featured on several major network television programs. The song "Chrome Cavities" from the album Flora was featured in a Kopparbergs Brewery advertisement. Their music has been featured in multiple StoryCorps podcasts and animated videos.

== Discography ==
=== Albums ===
- Na Na Ni (2008)
- Trilogi (2010)
- Flora (2011)

=== EPs ===
- Ner EP (2008)
- Holm EP (2008)
- Ava EP (2009)
- Origami (2010)
- Ornament EP (2012)

== Band members ==
- Fredrik Hultin - voice, words, guitar, alto horn, piano
- Ola Lindefelt - toms, mallets, cello, samples, voice, re-input electronics
- Anna Moberg - guitar, voice, analogue sound machinery
