= Friðriksson =

Friðriksson is an Icelandic patronymic, literally meaning "son of Friðrik". Notable people with the name include:

- Bjarni Friðriksson (born 1956), Icelandic judoka
- Elvar Már Friðriksson (born 1994), Icelandic basketball player
- Friðrik Friðriksson (born 1964), Icelandic footballer
- Friðrik Þór Friðriksson (born 1954), Icelandic film director
- Hanna Katrín Friðriksson (born 1964), Icelandic politician
- Kristinn Friðriksson, Icelandic basketball player and coach
- Þorsteinn B. Friðriksson, Icelandic businessman
