= List of shipwrecks in September 1855 =

The list of shipwrecks in September 1855 includes ships sunk, wrecked, grounded, or otherwise lost during September 1855.

== 1 September ==
List of shipwrecks: 1 September 1855
| Ship | State | Description |
|---|---|---|
| Aurora | Prussia | The schooner was driven ashore and wrecked at Blakeney, Norfolk, United Kingdom. She was on a voyage from Königsberg to Wells-next-the-Sea, Norfolk. |
| Calypso | Norway | The barque was abandoned in the Atlantic Ocean off Cape Finisterre, Spain. Her crew were rescued by the polacca Nuevo Rosalia ( Kingdom of the Two Sicilies). Calypso was on a voyage from Torrevieja, Spain to a Norwegian port. |
| Christina Henrica | Flag unknown | The ship departed from Sulina, Ottoman Empire for a British port. No further trace, presumed foundered with the loss of all hands. |
| Flora | United Kingdom | The schooner ran aground on a sunken wreck in the Orne. She was on a voyage from Caen, Calvados, France to London. She was refloated and put back to Caen. |
| Agnes | (United Kingdom of Great Britain and Ireland) Montserrat | The schooner capsized off Antigua with the loss of seven of the thirteen people on board. She was on a voyage from Montserrat to Barbados. |

== 2 September ==
List of shipwrecks: 2 September 1855
| Ship | State | Description |
|---|---|---|
| George Canning | United Kingdom | The ship departed from Kirkwall, Orkney Islands for Newcastle upon Tyne, Northumberland. No further trace, presumed foundered with the loss of all hands. |
| Malcolm | United Kingdom | The barque foundered 30 nautical miles (56 km) north east of Antigua. All on board survived. |
| Mary Ann | United Kingdom | The schooner sank off Aberthaw, Glamorgan. Her crew were rescued. |
| Montrose | United Kingdom | The ship struck a sunken rock and sank near Gothenburg, Sweden. She was on a voyage from Liverpool, Lancashire to Gothenburg. |

== 3 September ==
List of shipwrecks: 3 September 1855
| Ship | State | Description |
|---|---|---|
| Jarlin | Duchy of Holstein | The brig ran aground and was wrecked at Cardiff, Glamorgan. She was on a voyage from Cardiff to Alexandria, Egypt, United Kingdom. She was refloated on 9 September and beached at Penarth, Glamorgan. |
| Kent | United Kingdom | The barque foundered in the Pacific Ocean. Her crew were rescued. She was on a voyage from Callao, Peru to an English port. |
| Latigo | Spain | The brig capsized between Menorca and Mallorca with the loss of three of her crew. She was on a voyage from Charleston, South Carolina, United States to Barcelona. |
| Melanie Isabella | Belgium | The ship was destroyed by fire in the Scheldt. Her crew were rescued. She was on a voyage from Antwerp to Rio de Janeiro, Brazil. |
| Tonbridge | United Kingdom | The brig was wrecked on the Gunfleet Sands, in the North Sea off the coast of Essex. Her crew were rescued. |

== 4 September ==
List of shipwrecks: 4 September 1855
| Ship | State | Description |
|---|---|---|
| Agness | United Kingdom | The ship ran aground in the Baie de Somme. She was on a voyage from Dundee, Forfarshire to Saint-Valery-sur-Somme, Somme, France. She was refloated the next day and taken in to Saint-Valery-sur-Somme. |
| Charles Ferdinand | Hamburg | The ship foundered in the Atlantic Ocean. Her crew were rescued by Argyle (United Kingdom). |

== 5 September ==
List of shipwrecks: 5 September 1855
| Ship | State | Description |
|---|---|---|
| Canterbury | United Kingdom | The transport ship was wrecked near Viana do Castelo, Portugal. All 200 people on board survived. She was on a voyage from Corfu, United States of the Ionian Islands to a British port. |
| Diamond | United Kingdom | The barque was wrecked on the English Bank, in the River Plate. |

== 6 September ==
List of shipwrecks: 6 September 1855
| Ship | State | Description |
|---|---|---|
| Junior | (United Kingdom of Great Britain and Ireland) British North America | The barque was wrecked at Woody Point, Nova Scotia. Her crew were rescued. She was on a voyage from Liverpool, Lancashire to Quebec City, Province of Canada. |
| Kaffir | United Kingdom | The ship was wrecked on Inagua, Bahamas. She was on a voyage from the Rio de la Hacha to Liverpool. |
| Lady Milton | United Kingdom | The ship ran aground on the Englishman's Shoal, in the Bosphorus. She was refloated on 10 September. |
| Vidar | Flag unknown | The ship departed from Constantinople, Ottoman Empire for an English port. No further trace, presumed foundered with the loss of all hands. |

== 7 September ==
List of shipwrecks: 7 September 1855
| Ship | State | Description |
|---|---|---|
| Creole | (United Kingdom of Great Britain and Ireland) Victoria | The barque was wrecked on Cape Barren Island, Van Diemen's Land. All on board were rescued. She was on a voyage from New Zealand to Melbourne. |
| Incredible | United Kingdom | The ship was wrecked on Preparis, India. Her 21 crew took to the jollyboat, longboat and pinnace. Nine crew in the jollyboat were reported missing. The rest reached Moulmein, Burma. Incredible was on a voyage from Calcutta, India to London. |
| Sisters | United Kingdom | The smack collided with the steamship Arbutus (United Kingdom) and sank in the Belfast Lough. She was on a voyage from Belfast to Glenarm, County Antrim. |
| Stad Groningen | Netherlands | The galiot foundered off Cape de Gatt, Spain. All on board were rescued by the schooner Marsala (United Kingdom). Stad Groningen was on a voyage from Livorno, Grand Duchy of Tuscany to Liverpool, Lancashire, United Kingdom. |

== 8 September ==
List of shipwrecks: 8 September 1855
| Ship | State | Description |
|---|---|---|
| Aberfoyle | United Kingdom | The ship caught fire at Calcutta, India. She was severely damaged and was scuttled. She was on a voyage from Calcutta to Mauritius. |
| Norge | Norway | The paddle steamer collided with Bergen (Norway) and sank off Christiana with the loss of 48 of the 93 people on board. Survivors were rescued by Bergen. Norge was on a voyage from Christiana to Hamburg or vice versa. |
| Red Rover | (United Kingdom of Great Britain and Ireland) Van Diemen's Land | The schooner ran aground and sank at Cape Barren Island. All on board were rescued. She was on a voyage from Hobart to Warrnambool, Victoria. |

== 9 September ==
List of shipwrecks: 9 September 1855
| Ship | State | Description |
|---|---|---|
| Agnes | United Kingdom | The sloop foundered in the North Sea off Neufeld, Duchy of Schleswig. Her three crew were rescued. She was on a voyage from Altona to Inverness. |
| Alert | United Kingdom | The schooner ran aground in the Pentland Skerries. Her crew were rescued. She was on a voyage from Liverpool, Lancashire to Memel, Prussia. She was refloated on 11 September and towed in to Flotta, Orkney Islands. |
| Armata | United Kingdom | The barque was wrecked west of Gabarus, Nova Scotia, British North America. Her crew were rescued. She was on a voyage from Genoa, Kingdom of Sardinia to Quebec City, Province of Canada, British North America. |
| Dream | United Kingdom | The ship was driven ashore and wrecked at "Orixa", Ceylon, 30 nautical miles (56 km) south of the mouth of the Porce River. She was on a voyage from the Clyde to Calcutta, India. |

== 11 September ==
List of shipwrecks: 11 September 1855
| Ship | State | Description |
|---|---|---|
| Lady Cornwall | United Kingdom | The full-rigged ship was wrecked at Old Harbour, Jamaica. She was on a voyage from the Clyde to Jamaica. |
| Restless | United Kingdom | The ship ran aground on the Herd Sand, in the North Sea off the coast of County Durham. She was on a voyage from Newcastle upon Tyne to Brook, Isle of Wight. She was refloated the next day. |
| Yarra Yarra | (United Kingdom of Great Britain and Ireland) New South Wales | The steamship ran aground in the Yarra River. She was on a voyage from Melbourne, Victoria to Sydney. She was refloated the next day and resumed her voyage. |

== 12 September ==
List of shipwrecks: 12 September 1855
| Ship | State | Description |
|---|---|---|
| Abbotts Reading | United Kingdom | The barque was severely damaged by an explosion of gunpowder at Valparaíso, Chile. Two of her crew were killed and seven were seriously injured. |
| Sørridderen | Norway | The barque was driven ashore at Ljunghusen, Sweden. She was on a voyage from Hull, Yorkshire, United Kingdom to Holmsund, Sweden. |

== 13 September ==
List of shipwrecks: 13 September 1855
| Ship | State | Description |
|---|---|---|
| Captain | United Kingdom | The ship foundered in the Red Sea. Her crew survived. She was on a voyage from Hartlepool, County Durham to Suez, Egypt. |
| Jane Anderson | (United Kingdom of Great Britain and Ireland) Van Diemen's Land | The ship was wrecked off Eddystone Point. She was on a voyage from Recherche Bay to Port Phillip, Victoria. |

== 14 September ==
List of shipwrecks: 14 September 1855
| Ship | State | Description |
|---|---|---|
| Louise | France | The brig collided with the steamship Arabian (United Kingdom) and foundered in the Strait of Gibraltar. Her crew survived. She was on a voyage from Marseille, Bouches-du-Rhône to Saint-Malo, Ille-et-Vilaine. |
| Mary | United Kingdom | The schooner was in collision with another vessel and was abandoned in the North Sea off the coast of Suffolk. She was on a voyage from Port Madoc, Caernarfonshire to Hambugr. She was towed in to Aldeburgh, Suffolk by the pilot cutter Two Brothers (United Kingdom). |

== 15 September ==
List of shipwrecks: 15 September 1855
| Ship | State | Description |
|---|---|---|
| Meg of Meldon | United Kingdom | The barque was wrecked on Brava Island, Cape Verde Islands. Her crew were rescued. She was on a voyage from London to Madras, India. |

== 16 September ==
List of shipwrecks: 16 September 1855
| Ship | State | Description |
|---|---|---|
| Flora McDonald | (United Kingdom of Great Britain and Ireland) Barbados | The schooner was driven ashore on Barbados. She was later refloated and placed under repair. |
| Jane | United Kingdom | The trow was foundered in the Bristol Channel off Burnham-on-Sea, Somerset. All five people on board were rescued by Providence (United Kingdom). Jane was on a voyage from Cardiff, Glamorgan to Bridgwater, Somerset. |

== 17 September ==
List of shipwrecks: 17 September 1855
| Ship | State | Description |
|---|---|---|
| Archimedes | United Kingdom | The ship was driven ashore at Quebec City, Province of Canada, British North America. She was refloated. |
| Tam o'Shanter | United Kingdom | The ship ran aground in Liverpool Bay off the Formby Lightship ( Trinity House). She was on a voyage from Liverpool, Lancashire to Virgin Island. She was refloated and resumed her voyage. |

== 18 September ==
List of shipwrecks: 18 September 1855
| Ship | State | Description |
|---|---|---|
| Hinda | United Kingdom | The ship ran aground at Eartholmen, Denmark. She was on a voyage from Danzig to London. She was refloated and taken in to Eartholmen. |
| HMS La Hogue | Royal Navy | The Vengeur-class ship of the line ran aground off Renskär, Sweden and was severely damaged. She was refloated with the assistance of three gunboats. |
| Platina | United Kingdom | The barque collided with the barque Charles C. Fowler (United States) and sank in the Grand Banks of Newfoundland (49°30′N 34°30′W). Her fourteen crew were rescued by Charles C. Fowler. Platina was on a voyage from Fowey, Cornwall to Quebec City, Province of Canada, British North America. |
| Tchernaya | (United Kingdom of Great Britain and Ireland) British North America | The ship ran aground on being launched at Quebec City, Province of Canada. She was refloated and found to be leaky. |

== 19 September ==
List of shipwrecks: 19 September 1855
| Ship | State | Description |
|---|---|---|
| Eden | United Kingdom | The ship ran aground on the Kratzand, in the North Sea. She was on a voyage from Hartlepool, County Durham to Itzehoe, Duchy of Schleswig. She was refloated and taken in to Cuxhaven. |
| Glide | United Kingdom | The ship was wrecked on the Miner's Ledge with the loss of all hands. She was on a voyage from the Clyde to Halifax, Nova Scotia and Windsor, Nova Scotia, British North America. |

== 20 September ==
List of shipwrecks: 20 September 1855
| Ship | State | Description |
|---|---|---|
| Melrose | United Kingdom | The brig ran aground on the Arklow Bank, in the Irish Sea off the coast of County Wicklow. She was on a voyage from Liverpool, Lancashire to Harbour Grace, Newfoundland, British North America. She was refloated the next day and taken in to Kingstown, County Dublin. |

== 21 September ==
List of shipwrecks: 21 September 1855
| Ship | State | Description |
|---|---|---|
| Melrose | (United Kingdom of Great Britain and Ireland) British North America | The brig ran aground on the Arklow Bank, in the Irish Sea off the coast of County Wicklow. She was on a voyage from Liverpool, Lancashire to Saint John, New Brunswick. She was refloated and put in to Kingstown, County Dublin. |

== 22 September ==
List of shipwrecks: 22 September 1855
| Ship | State | Description |
|---|---|---|
| Catherine Isabella | United Kingdom | The ship was driven ashore at Vidlan Voe, Shetland Islands. |
| Elbing | Elbing | The steamship caught fire at "Skopen", Prussia and was scuttled. Her crew were rescued. |
| Maria Riefina | Netherlands | The galiot ran aground on the Owers Sandbank, in the English Channel off the coast of Sussex, United Kingdom. She was on a voyage from Liverpool, Lancashire, United Kingdom to Königsberg, Prussia. She was refloated and taken in to Portsmouth, Hampshire, United Kingdom. |

== 23 September ==
List of shipwrecks: 23 September 1855
| Ship | State | Description |
|---|---|---|
| Cambria | United Kingdom | The full-rigged ship ran aground on the Goodwin Sands, Kent. She was on a voyage from Saint Domingo to Hamburg. She was refloated and taken in to The Downs. |
| Crimea | United Kingdom | The ship ran aground off Helsingør, Denmark. She was on a voyage from Memel, Prussia to Dundee, Forfarshire. She was refloated on 25 September with assistance from HMS Cornwallis (Royal Navy) and resumed her voyage. |
| Dart | United Kingdom | The schooner ran aground on the Goodwin Sands. She was on a voyage from Newcastle upon Tyne, Northumberland to Bristol, Gloucestershire. She was refloated and resumed her voyage. |
| Hawk, or Hope | United Kingdom | The schooner was driven ashore and wrecked at the entrance to the Agger Canal, Denmark. She was on a voyage from Sunderland, County Durham to Swinemünde, Prussia. She was refloated the next day. |

== 24 September ==
List of shipwrecks: 24 September 1855
| Ship | State | Description |
|---|---|---|
| Buchan Maid | United Kingdom | The ship was wrecked at Rønne, Denmark. Her crew were rescued. She was on a voyage from Fraserburgh, Aberdeenshire to Danzig. |
| Chesapeake | United States | The schooner collided with Annie (United Kingdom) and foundered in the Atlantic Ocean. Her crew were rescued by Annie. Chespeake was on a voyage from Rockland, Maine to New York. |
| Vigilant | France | The ship was driven ashore east of Dunkirk, Nord. She was on a voyage from Stockholm, Sweden to Dunkirk. She was declared a total loss. |
| Violet | United Kingdom | The sailing barge ran aground in the Colne Navigation and was damaged. |

== 25 September ==
List of shipwrecks: 25 September 1855
| Ship | State | Description |
|---|---|---|
| Antelope | United Kingdom | The steamship ran aground at Constantinople, Ottoman Empire. She was refloated on 27 September. |
| Q. E. D. | United Kingdom | The barque was wrecked at Courcelles, near Havre de Grâce, Seine-Inférieure, France. Her crew were rescued. |

== 26 September ==
List of shipwrecks: 26 September 1855
| Ship | State | Description |
|---|---|---|
| Invincible | United States | The ship was in collision with Trafalgar in the River Mersey and was severely damaged. |
| Isaiah | United Kingdom | The ship was driven ashore near New York, United States. She was on a voyage from Hillsborough, New Brunswick, British North America to New York. She was later refloated and taken in to Brooklyn. |
| Lord Raglan | United Kingdom | The ship was blown out to sea from Sint Eustatius and was presumed to have subsequently foundered. Her crew were ashore. |

== 27 September ==
List of shipwrecks: 27 September 1855
| Ship | State | Description |
|---|---|---|
| Reindeer | United Kingdom | The ship was wrecked on a reef in the Pacific Ocean. Her crew survived. She was on a voyage from Australia to Shanghai, China. |

== 28 September ==
List of shipwrecks: 28 September 1855
| Ship | State | Description |
|---|---|---|
| John McKenzie | United Kingdom | The ship was abandoned off Rathlin Island, County Donegal. She was on a voyage from Quebec City, Province of Canada, British North America to Greenock, Renfrewshire. She was subsequently taken in to the Belfast Lough. |
| Princess | United Kingdom | The schooner capsized at "Wanchew", China with the loss of eight of her crew. |

== 29 September ==
List of shipwrecks: 29 September 1855
| Ship | State | Description |
|---|---|---|
| Brothers | (United Kingdom of Great Britain and Ireland) New Zealand | The schooner stranded on a sandbar at Taieri Mouth and was wrecked. The vessel was carrying fresh produce to Dunedin. |
| Faithful | United Kingdom | The ship was destroyed by fire off Tampico, Mexico. Her crew were rescued. |

== 30 September ==
List of shipwrecks: 30 September 1855
| Ship | State | Description |
|---|---|---|
| Maida | United Kingdom | The ship was lost in Montevideo Bay. |
| William Penn | United States | The ship was wrecked on the Hatteras Shoal, in the Atlantic Ocean off the coast of North Carolina with the loss to two of the 20-24 people on board. Nine people took to a raft and were reported missing. Survivors were rescued by the schooner C. C. Stratton and the brig Marius (both United States). William Penn was on a voyage from the Chincha Islands, Peru to New Bedford, Massachusetts. |

== Unknown date ==
List of shipwrecks: Unknown date in September 1855
| Ship | State | Description |
|---|---|---|
| Agnes | United Kingdom | The ship was wrecked near Chusan, China before 15 September. |
| Albion | United Kingdom | The barque was abandoned in the Atlantic Ocean before 1 October. Her crew were rescued. She was on a voyage from Quebec City, Province of Canada, British North America to Hartlepool, County Durham. |
| Andromeda | United Kingdom | The ship foundered in the Mediterranean Sea off La Palma, Canary Islands, Spain before 15 September. |
| Barbara | United Kingdom | The schooner sprang a leak and sank in the Bay of Biscay on or before 24 September. Her crew were rescued by the brig Elizabeth (France). Barbara was on a voyage from Limpias, Spain to Liverpool, Lancashire. |
| Bartley | United Kingdom | The brig ran aground on the Goodwin Sands, Kent. Her crew were rescued by the lifeboat Northumberland (United Kingdom). She was refloated on 25 September with assistance from Sampson (United Kingdom). |
| Carleton | United Kingdom | The barque ran aground in the Gulf of Smyrna. She was on a voyage from Troon, Ayrshire to Smyrna, Ottoman Empire. She was refloated after several days and taken in to Smyrna, arriving on 14 September. |
| Clypso | Norway | The ship sprag a leak and was abandoned in the Atlantic Ocean. All on board were rescued by Nuova Rosalin ( Kingdom of the Two Sicilies). |
| Constance Emma | United Kingdom | The ship was lost in the Red Sea. Her crew were rescued. |
| Elizabeth Jane | United Kingdom | The ship was driven ashore at Great Yarmouth, Norfolk. She was refloated on 27 September and taken in to Great Yarmouth. |
| Enterprise | United Kingdom | The barque was abandoned in the South Atlantic. |
| Heinewyka | Netherlands | The sloop sprang a leak and foundered in the Dogger Bank. Her crew were rescued by the schooner Elnathan (Norway). Heinewyka was on a voyage from Hartlepool, County Durham, United Kingdom of Great Britain and Ireland to the Eider Canal. |
| Industrie | France | The ship was wrecked at Saint-Louis, Senegal before 9 September. She was on a voyage from Newcastle upon Tyne, Northumberland, United Kingdom to Saint-Louis. |
| Janet | United Kingdom | The ship was wrecked on the Jardanillos, off the coast of Cuba before 5 September. She was on a voyage from Cuba to Queenstown, County Cork. |
| Jessie Anne | United Kingdom | The brig ran aground on the Goodwin Sands. Her crew were rescued by the lifeboat Northumberland (United Kingdom). |
| Julia | United Kingdom | The schooner ran aground on the Blacktail Bank, in the Thames Estuary before 9 September. |
| Mary Jones | United States | The fishing schooner was lost on Prince Edward Island. Crew saved. |
| Mountijo | (United Kingdom of Great Britain and Ireland) British North America | The ship was abandoned in the Atlantic Ocean. Her crew were rescued by an American vessel. Monutijo was on a voyage from Shediac, Nova Scotia to Liverpool. She was still afloat on 3 January 1856. |
| Rapid | United Kingdom | The ship foundered of Cape de Gatt, Spain. She was on a voyage from Salonica, Greece to an English port. |
| Santa Annunziata | Flag unknown | The barque was in collision with the steamship Mongibello (Flag unknown) and sank in the Mediterranean Sea off the Îles d'Hyères, Var, France with the loss of two lives. |
| Sebastopol | (United States) Oregon Territory | The steamship was wrecked at Milwaukie with the loss of six lives. |
| Syrène | French Navy | Crimean War, Siege of Sevastopol: The Marie Thérèse-class frigate was sunk at Sevastopol, Russia. She was refloated. |
| Trovatore | Kingdom of the Two Sicilies | The ship was lost off Cape St. Vincent, Portugal before 3 September. She was on a voyage from Liverpool to Naples. |
