= Frick =

Frick may refer to:

- Frick, Aargau, a municipality in Switzerland
- Frick (surname)
- Frick of Frick and Frack, ice skating comedy duo
- A minced oath of fuck

== See also ==
- Freak (disambiguation)
- Frick Park, a major park in Pittsburgh
- The Frick Pittsburgh, a Pittsburgh museum
- Frick Fine Arts Building, University of Pittsburgh
- Frick Building, a skyscraper in Pittsburgh
- Frick Collection, New York City museum
- Frick Art Research Library, a research institution affiliated with the Frick Collection
