= Skanörs Ljung Nature Reserve =

Nature reserve in Skåne, Sweden

Coordinates: 55.404722°N 12.887222°E

Skanörs Ljung Nature Reserve (Swedish: Skanörs ljung) is situated in the South-Western part of the Scania province of Sweden, in the Vellinge Municipality between Ljunghusen and Skanör-Falsterbo. Skanörs Ljung became a designated nature reserve 1969 and encompasses a total area of 5.75 km^{2} of which 2.122 km^{2} is the marine portion.
