= Albert Frick =

Albert Frick may refer to:

- Albert Frick (theologian) (1714–1776), German theologian
- Albert Frick (politician) (born 1948), Liechtenstein politician
- Albert Frick (skier) (born 1949), Liechtenstein Olympic alpine skier
