= Guinness World Records =

British reference book listing world records

- Guinness World Records Limited
- Editor: Craig Glenday
- Publisher: Jim Pattison Group
- Publication place: United Kingdom
- English publication date: 27 August 1955; 71 years ago – present
- Media type: Book; television
- Website: www.guinnessworldrecords.de

Guinness World Records (/ˈɡɪnɪs/), known from its inception in 1955 until 1999 as The Guinness Book of Records and in previous United States editions as The Guinness Book of World Records, is a British reference book published annually, listing world records both of human achievements and the extremes of the natural world. Sir Hugh Beaver created the concept in order to settle pub debates, and twin brothers Norris and Ross McWhirter co-founded the book in London in late August 1955.

The first edition topped the bestseller list in the United Kingdom by Christmas 1955. The following year the book was launched internationally, and as of the 2026 edition, it is now in its 71st year of publication, published in 100 countries and 40 languages, and maintains over 53,000 records in its database.

The international franchise has extended beyond print to include television series and museums. The popularity of the franchise has resulted in Guinness World Records becoming the primary international source for cataloguing and verification of a huge number of world records. The organisation employs record adjudicators to verify the authenticity of the setting and breaking of records.

Following a series of owners, the franchise has been owned by the Jim Pattison Group since 2008, with its headquarters moved to South Quay Plaza, Canary Wharf, London, in 2017. Since 2008, Guinness World Records has orientated its business model away from selling books, and towards creating new world records as publicity exercises for individuals and organisations, which has attracted criticism.

== History ==
On 10 November 1951, Sir Hugh Beaver, then the managing director of the Guinness Breweries, went on a shooting party in the North Slob, by the River Slaney in County Wexford, Ireland. After missing a shot at a golden plover, he became involved in an argument over whether the golden plover or the red grouse was the fastest game bird in Europe (the plover is faster, but neither is the fastest game bird in Europe). That evening at Castlebridge House, he realised that it was impossible to confirm in reference books whether or not the golden plover was Europe's fastest game bird. Beaver knew that there must have been numerous other questions debated nightly among the public, but there was no book in the world with which to settle arguments about records. He realised then that a book supplying the answers to this sort of question might prove successful.

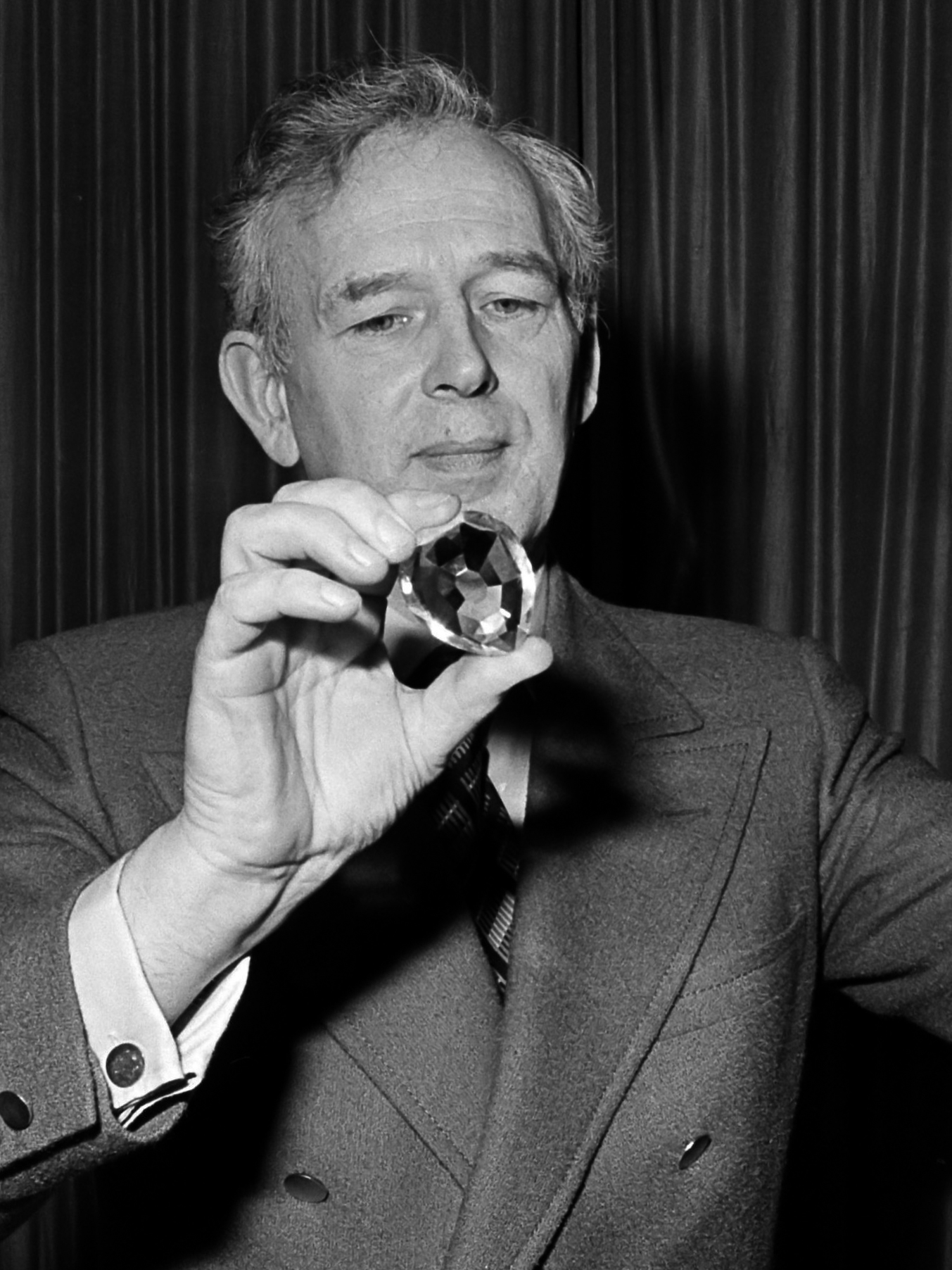
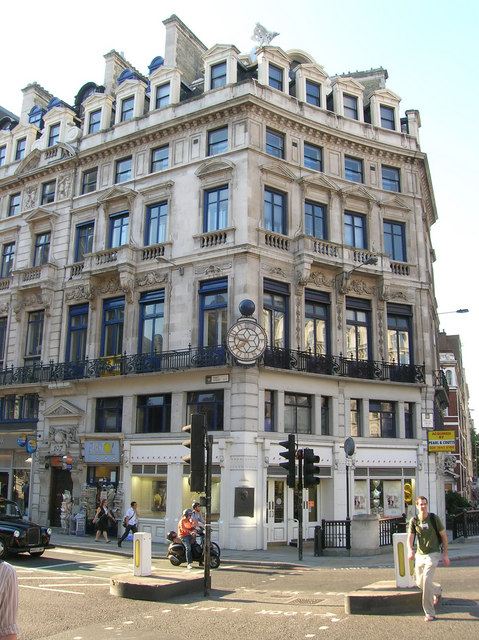
Norris McWhirter co-founded the book with his twin brother Ross in August 1955 at Ludgate House, 107 Fleet Street, London.

A thousand copies of The Guinness Book of Records were distributed for free to pubs across Britain and Ireland as a promotional asset for the Guinness brand, and they became immensely popular with customers; as a result a proper book of records for retail was commissioned. Guinness employee Christopher Chataway recommended university friends Norris and Ross McWhirter, who had been running a fact-finding agency in London. On 14 September 1954 the twin brothers were commissioned to compile The Guinness Book of Records.

After the founding of The Guinness Book of Records office at the top of Ludgate House, 107 Fleet Street, London, the first 198-page edition was bound on 27 August 1955 and went to the top of the British bestseller list by Christmas. The following year, it was introduced into the United States by New York publisher David Boehm and sold 70,000 copies. Since then, Guinness World Records has sold more than 150 million copies in 100 countries and 40 languages. Due to the book's surprise success, many further editions were printed, eventually settling into a pattern of one revision a year, published in September/October, in time for Christmas.

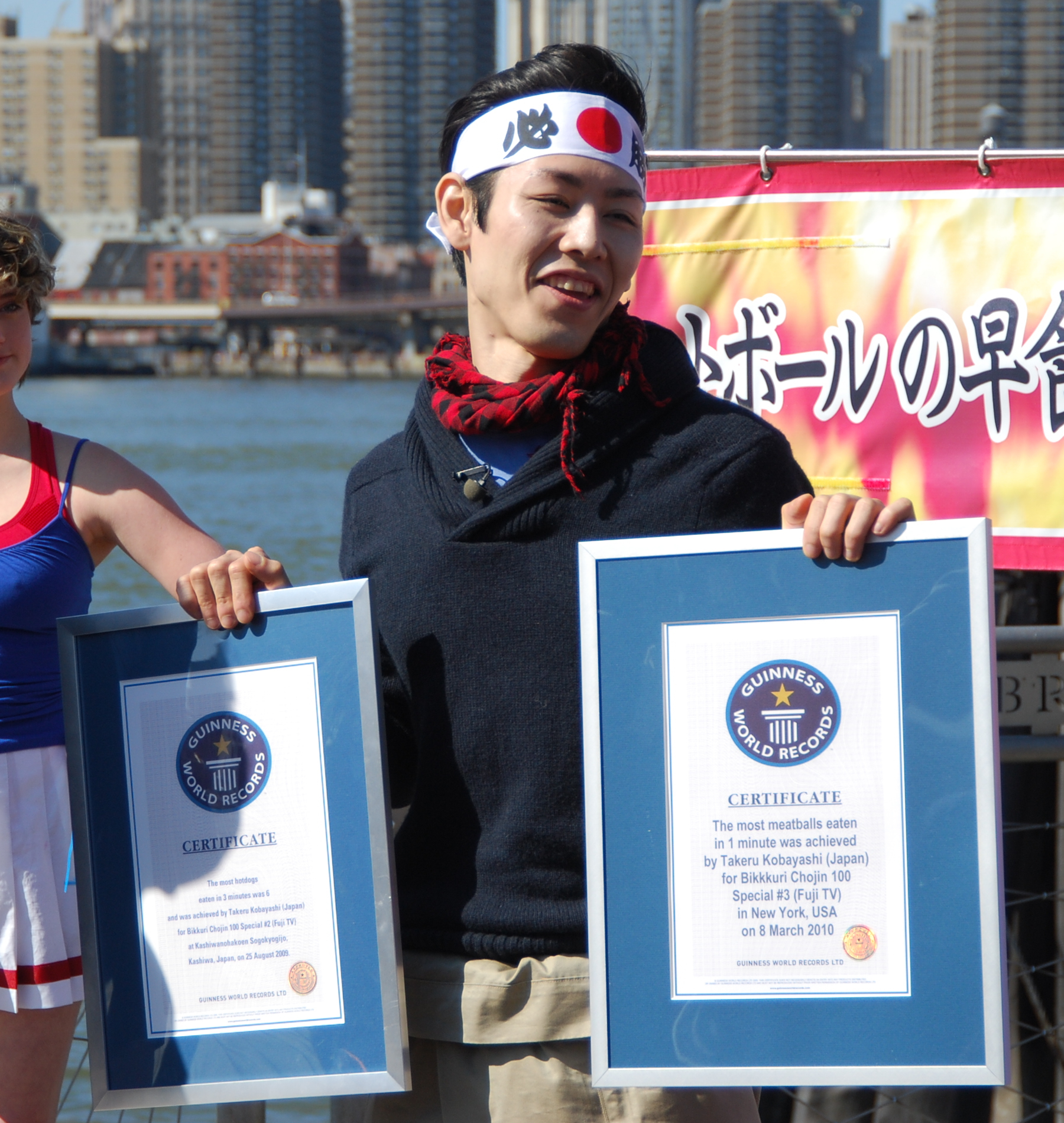
Japanese competitive eater Takeru Kobayashi with two Guinness World Record certificates

The McWhirters continued to compile the book for many years. Both brothers had an encyclopedic memory; on the British children's television series Record Breakers (based upon the book), which was broadcast on the BBC from 1972 to 2001, they would take questions posed by children in the audience on various world records and were able to give the correct answer. Roger Bannister, the first person to run a mile in under four minutes (a time announced by Norris at the track in Oxford), was the first guest on the show. Ross McWhirter was assassinated by two members of the Provisional Irish Republican Army in 1975, in response to offering a £50,000 reward for information that would lead to the capture of members of the organisation. Following Ross's assassination, the feature on the show where questions about records posed by children were answered was called Norris on the Spot. Norris carried on as the book's sole editor.

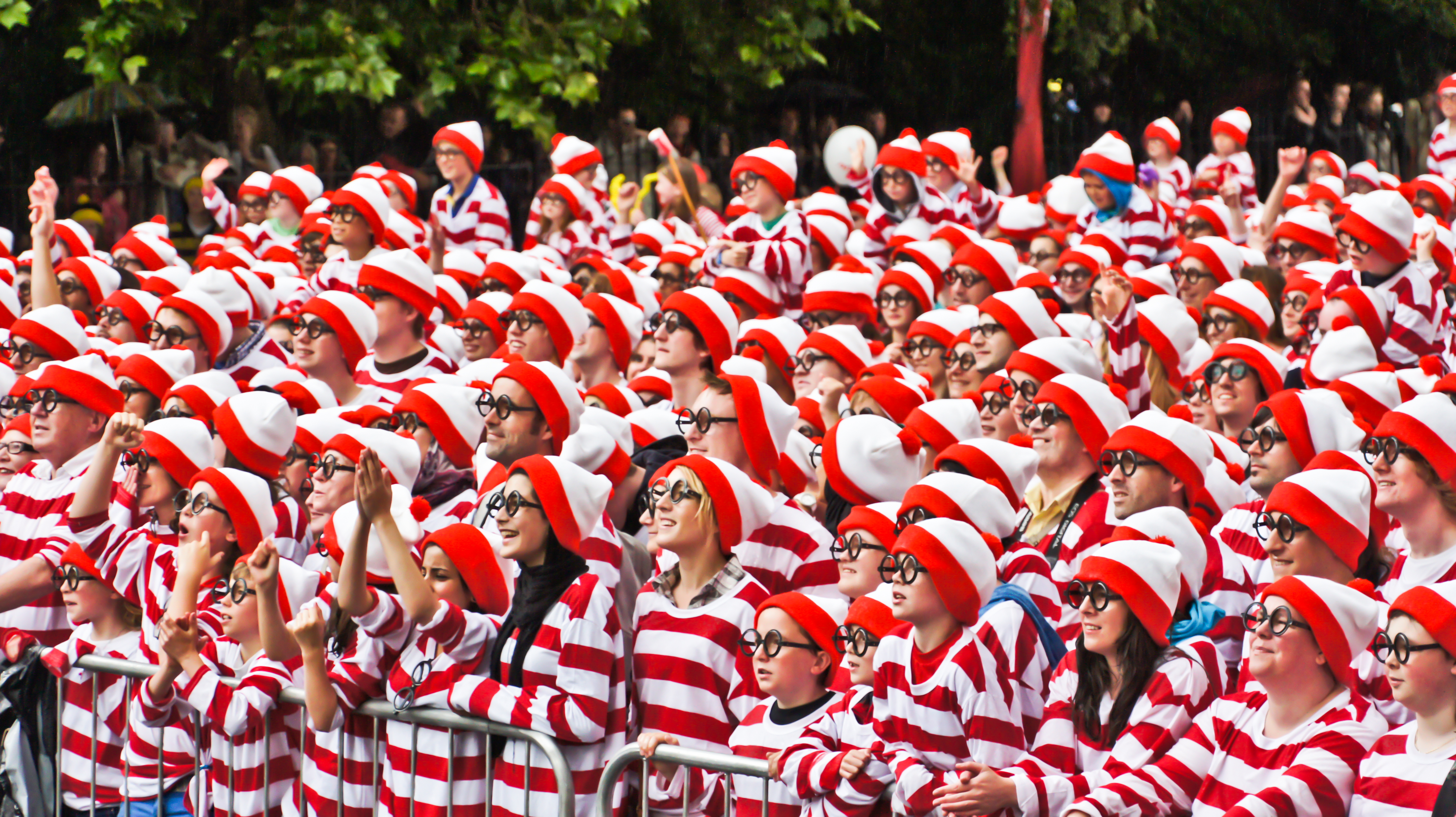
Attendees at the 2011 Where's Wally? Guinness World Record event in Dublin, Ireland. Setting a record for 3,872 people dressed as Wally, the total was surpassed in 2017 with 4,626 people in Japan.

Guinness Superlatives, later Guinness World Records Limited, was incorporated in London in 1954 to publish the first book. In 1975, the first licensed product produced, Guinness Game of World Records, was launched by Denys Fisher Toys UK. Sterling Publishing owned the rights to the Guinness book in the US for decades until it was repurchased by Guinness in 1989 after an 18-month long lawsuit. The group was owned by Guinness PLC and subsequently Diageo until 2001, when it was purchased by Gullane Entertainment for £45.5 million ($65 million). Gullane was itself purchased by HIT Entertainment in 2002. In 2006, Apax Partners purchased HIT and subsequently sold Guinness World Records in early 2008 to the Jim Pattison Group, the parent company of Ripley Entertainment, which is licensed to operate Guinness World Records' Attractions. With offices in New York City and Tokyo, Guinness World Records' global headquarters remain in South Quay Plaza in Canary Wharf, London, while its museum attractions are based at Ripley headquarters in Orlando, Florida.

=== Evolution ===
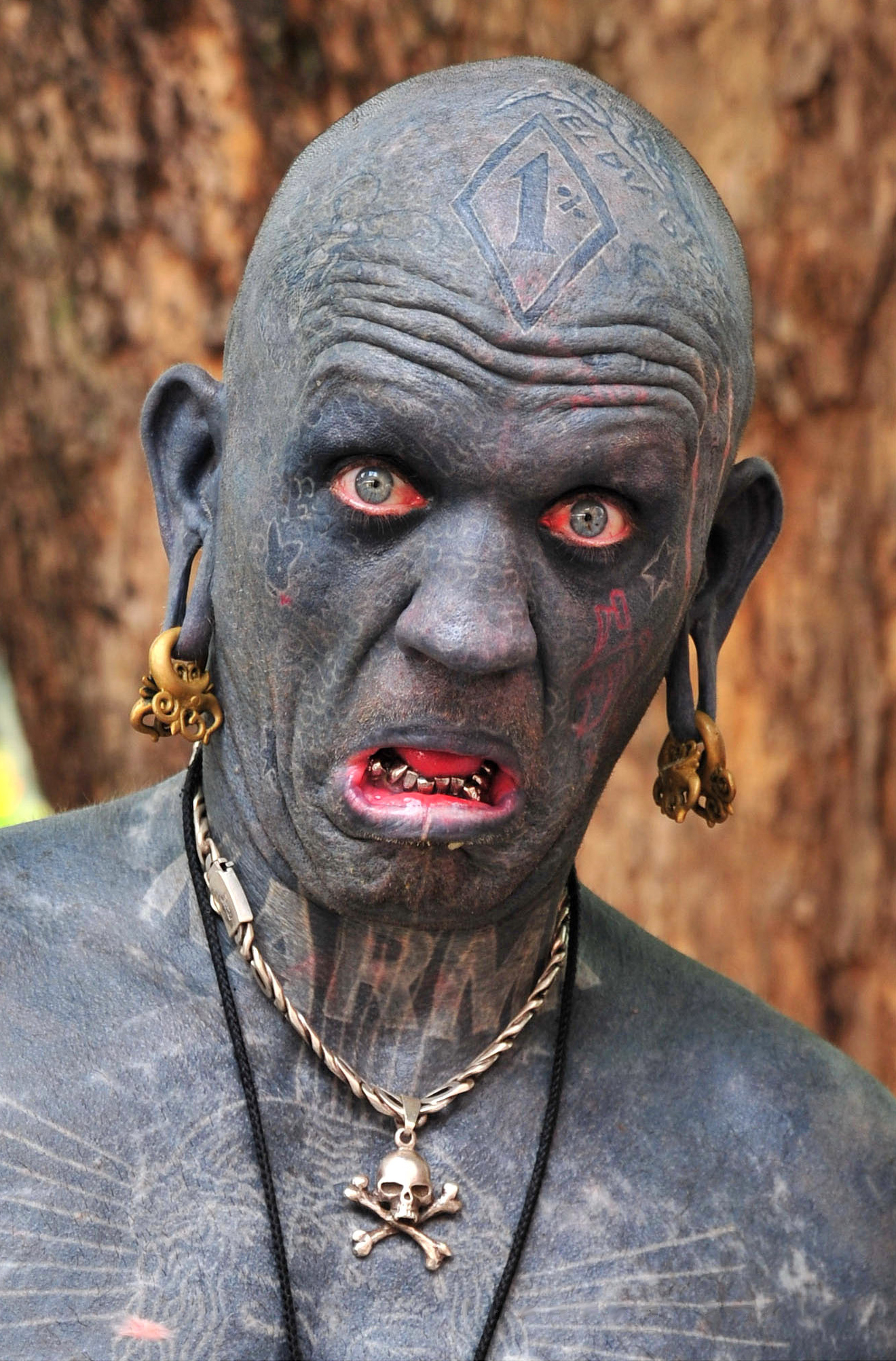
As of 2006, Lucky Diamond Rich holds the Guinness World Record of "The world's most tattooed person", with tattoos covering his entire body.

Recent editions have focused on record feats by individuals. Competitions range from obvious ones such as Olympic weightlifting to the longest egg tossing distances, or for the longest time spent playing Grand Theft Auto IV or the largest number of hot dogs consumed in three minutes. Besides records about competitions, it contains such facts such as the heaviest tumour, the most poisonous fungus, the longest-running soap opera and the most valuable life-insurance policy, among others. Many records also relate to the youngest people to have achieved something, such as the youngest person to visit all nations of the world, currently held by Maurizio Giuliano. Others relate to the oldest person to be doing something, such the Oldest Drag King, currently held by El Daña.

Each edition contains a selection of the records from the Guinness World Records database, as well as select new records, with the criteria for inclusion changing from year to year. The latest edition is the 72nd, published in August 2025.

The retirement of Norris McWhirter from his consulting role in 1995 and the subsequent decision by Diageo to sell The Guinness Book of Records brand have shifted the focus of the books from text-orientated to illustrated reference. A selection of records are curated for the book from the full archive but all existing Guinness World Records titles can be accessed by creating a login on the company's website. Applications made by individuals for existing record categories are free of charge. There is an administration fee of £5 (or $5) to propose a new record title.

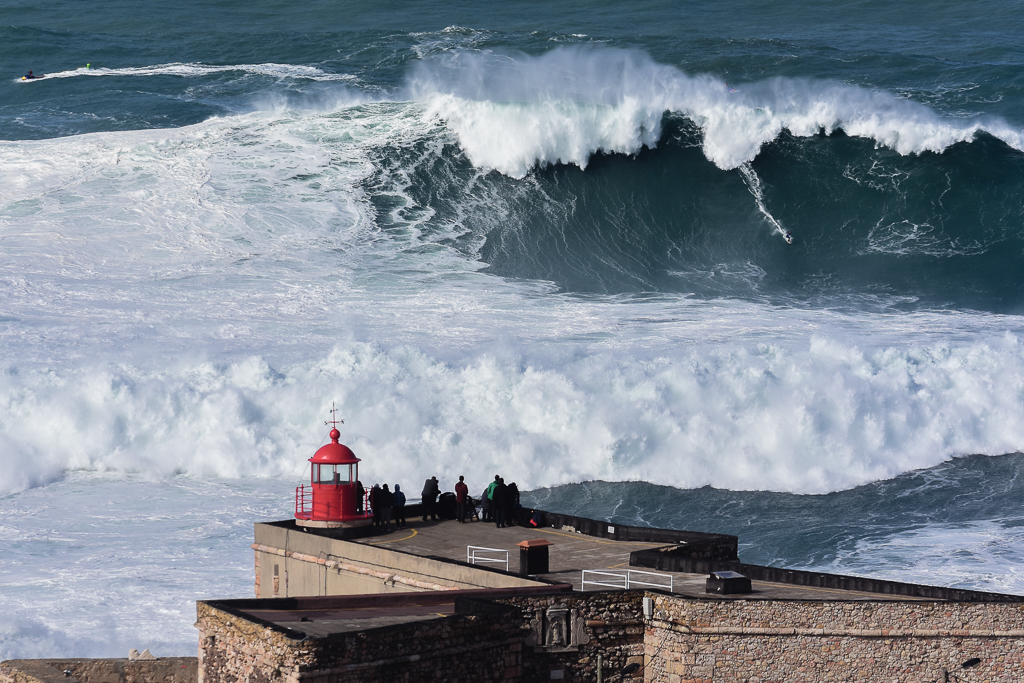
The North Beach (Nazaré, Portugal), listed on the Guinness World Records for the biggest waves ever surfed

A number of spin-off books and television series have also been produced. Guinness World Records bestowed the record of "Person with the most records" on Ashrita Furman of Queens, New York, in April 2009; at that time, he held 100 records.

In 2005, Guinness designated 9 November as International Guinness World Records Day to encourage breaking of world records. In 2006, an estimated 100,000 people participated in over 10 countries. Guinness reported 2,244 new records in 12 months, which was a 173% increase over the previous year. In February 2008, NBC aired The Top 100 Guinness World Records of All Time and Guinness World Records made the complete list available on their website.

The popularity of the franchise has resulted in Guinness World Records becoming the primary international authority on the cataloguing and verification of a huge number of world records.

=== List of discontinued Guinness World Records ===
Over its history, numerous world record categories have been discontinued. This list may include that the record poses a threat to health, safety, or the environment.

Record	Reason to discontinue	Record holder	Last appearance	Ref.
The largest ever mass balloon release	Environmental concerns (see Balloonfest '86)	Balloonfest '86	1988	
Largest audience at a camel wrestling festival (and other controversial animal sports)	Concerns with animal welfare	The 1994 Camel Wrestling Festival in Selçuk, Turkey, had an audience of 20,000.	2010	
Fastest journey around the world by car	Speed limits	In late 1991, Saloo and Nenna Choudhury from Kolkata, India, covered 24,901 miles (40,074 km) of distance in 39 days and 20 hours using a Nissan Sunny, which travelled through 25 countries.	1991	
Fastest yodel		In February 1992, a German yodeler named Thomas Scholl hit 12 tones in one second, 15 of which were falsetto.	1992	
Heaviest pets	Animal welfare. Encouraged people to overfeed their pets	The winner for heaviest cat, Himmy, had to be transported in a wheelbarrow and weighed 21.3 kg (46 lb 15 oz) upon his death from respiratory failure in 1986.	1998	
Hunger strikes and fasting	Health concerns			
Untimed gluttony	Health concerns	The 1955 edition declared the fastest time to eat an ox was 42 days, completed in 1880 by Germany's Johann Ketzler. A total of 43 gluttony records were discontinued in 1989, with just greatest omnivore remaining for historic value (Michel Lotito consumed chandeliers, bicycles, television sets, and a Cessna light aircraft). Though Guinness was not aware of anyone dying while attempting the records, a representative said "they are simply gross".	1989	
Largest penny pyramid	Penny shortages	In 1984, the award went to two preteens from Arizona named Marc Edwards and Ben Schlimme, Jr., who built a structure of 104,000 pennies.	1984	
Largest pie fight	Wasteful. Food in record attempts to be used "for general consumption by humans"	On January 7, 2010, Shaw Floors, an organizer of largest pie fight with a total of 434 people, hit each other with 1200 chocolates, apples, and cherry pies "to demonstrate the stain resistance of a premium nylon carpet" at a sales conference in Texas.	2010	
Longest kiss	Dangers associated with sleep deprivation	In 2013, Thai couple Ekkachai and Laksana Tiranarat kissed for 58 hours and 35 minutes.	2013	
Longest time spent buried alive	Unsafe	In 1998, a "human mole" named Geoff Smith remained underground for 147 days in order to achieve the Guinness record and beat his mother's 101-day stint. Guinness denied the award for safety reasons, and Geoff stated "There are far more dangerous things in the book. There is a record for a man who eats cars."	1998	
Longest time spent without sleeping	Health concerns	Randy Gardner, an American man from San Diego, California, stayed awake for 11 days and 25 minutes between December 1962 and January 1963, breaking the previous record of 260 hours held by Tom Rounds.	1997	
Most beer drunk in an hour	Health concerns	Within 60 minutes, 23-year-old Jack Keyes drank 36 pints of beer. The feat occurred in 1969 in Northern Ireland.	1989	
Most difficult tongue twister		The 1974 edition featured "The sixth sick sheik's sixth sheep's sick".	1974	
Most greeting cards received by an individual	Fear of overwhelming the postal system	Young British brain cancer patient Craig Shergold set a record for receiving 33 million cards between 1989 and May 1991. However, due to an email hoax, the deluge of mail continued for more than a decade after Craig's recovery.	1991	
Most guitars smashed during a concert tour	"Guitar welfare"	Matthew Bellamy of the English rock band Muse wrecked 140 guitars during a tour in 2004.	2004	
Most sky lanterns released simultaneously	Environmental concerns	In May 2013, 15,185 sky lanterns were released in Iloilo City, Philippines, to promote world peace.	2013	
Most tweets in a single second		There were 143,199 tweets sent in a second on 2 August 2013. It occurred as the Studio Ghibli film Castle in the Sky aired on Japan television because of a tradition of tweeting the word balse as it is said on screen. The previous record of 33,388 was set during a different airing of the film.	2013	
Fastest violinist	Difficulty in conclusively determining whether all musical notes have been sufficiently played (even when slowed down)		2017	

== Defining records ==
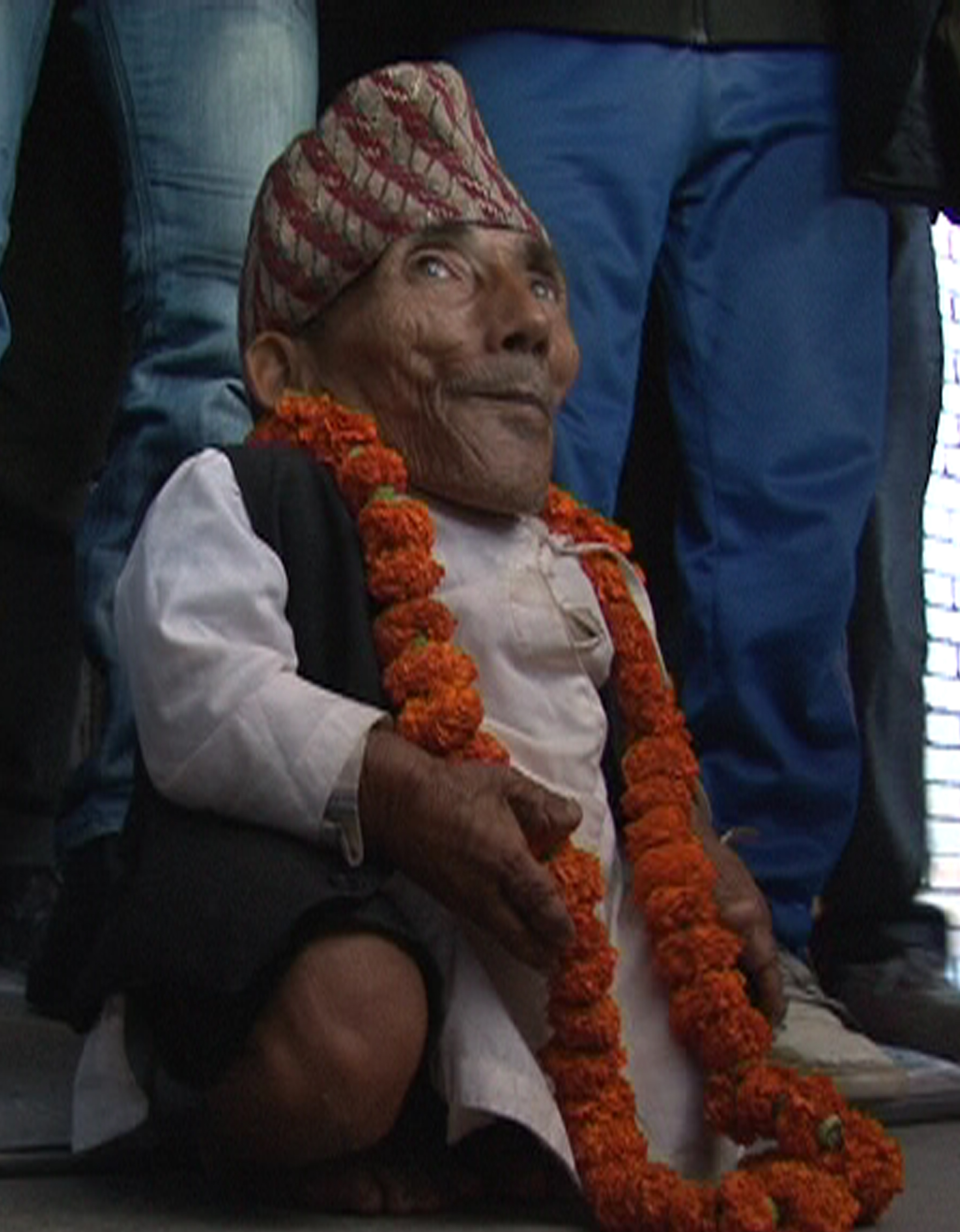
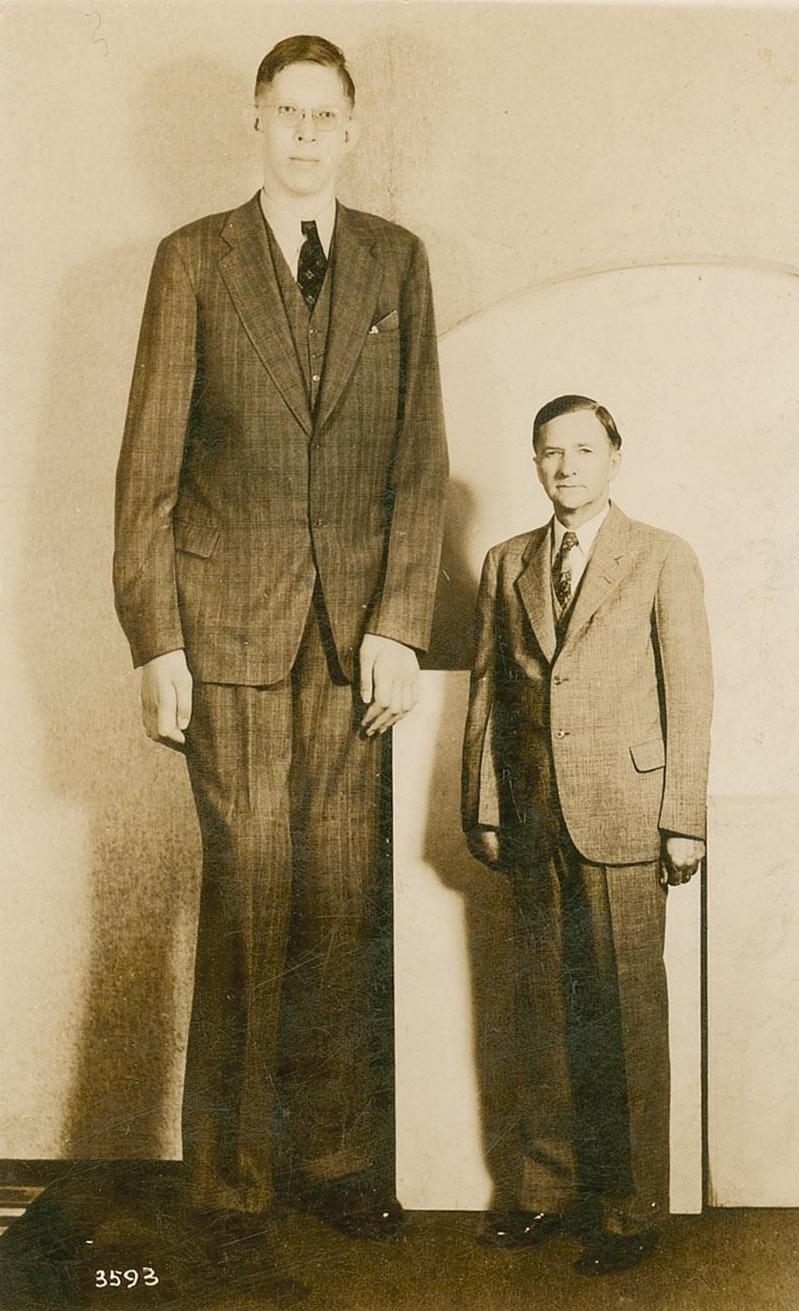
Chandra Bahadur Dangi from Nepal, measuring 1 ft 9 1/2 in (54.6 cm), is recognised as the world's shortest man ever, while the tallest is Robert Wadlow from the US, at 8 feet 11 inches (2.72 m), both verified by Guinness World Records.

For many records, Guinness World Records is the effective authority on the exact requirements for them and with whom records reside, the company providing adjudicators to events to determine the veracity of record attempts. The list of records which the Guinness World Records covers is not fixed, records may be added and also removed for various reasons. The public is invited to submit applications for records, which can be either the bettering of existing records or substantial achievements which could constitute a new record. The company also provides corporate services for companies to "harness the power of record-breaking to deliver tangible success for their businesses."

=== Ethical and safety issues ===
Guinness World Records states several types of records it will not accept for ethical reasons, such as those related to the killing or harming of animals. In the 2006 Guinness Book of World Records, Colombian serial killer Pedro López was listed as the "most prolific serial killer", having murdered at least 110 people (with Lopez himself claiming he murdered over 300 people) in Colombia, Ecuador and Peru in the late 1960s to 1980s. This was later removed after complaints that it made a competition out of murder; however the record was reinstated in the 2026 edition.

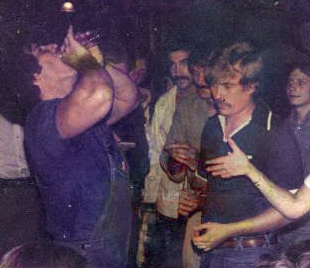
Steven Petrosino drinking 1 liter of beer in 1.3 seconds in June 1977. Petrosino set record times for 250 ml, 500 ml and 1.5 liters as well, but Guinness accepted only the record for one liter. They later dropped all alcohol records from their compendium in 1991, then reinstated the records in 2008.

Several world records that were once included in the book have been removed for ethical reasons, including concerns for the well-being of potential record breakers. For example, following publication of the "heaviest pet" record, many owners overfed their pets beyond the bounds of what was healthy, and therefore such entries were removed. The Guinness Book also dropped records within their "eating and drinking records" section of Human Achievements in 1991 over concerns that potential competitors could harm themselves and expose the publisher to potential litigation. These changes included the removal of all spirit, wine and beer drinking records, along with other unusual records for consuming such unlikely things as bicycles and trees. Other records, such as sword swallowing and rally driving (on public roads), were closed from further entry as the current holders had performed beyond what are considered safe human tolerance levels. There have been instances of closed categories being reopened. For example, the sword swallowing category was listed as closed in the 1990 Guinness Book of World Records, but has since been reopened with Johnny Strange breaking a sword swallowing record on Guinness World Records Live. Similarly, the speed beer drinking records which were dropped from the book in 1991, reappeared 17 years later in the 2008 edition, but were moved from the "Human Achievements" section of the older book to the "Modern Society" section of the newer edition.

As of 2011, it is required in the guidelines of all "large food" type records that the item be fully edible, and distributed to the public for consumption, to prevent food wastage. Chain letters are also not allowed: "Guinness World Records does not accept any records relating to chain letters, sent by post or e-mail." After Roger Guy English set the record for sleeplessness in 1974, the category was discontinued for being too dangerous. At the request of the U.S. Mint, in 1984, the book stopped accepting claims of large hoardings of pennies or other currency. Environmentally unfriendly records (such as the releasing of sky lanterns and party balloons) are no longer accepted or monitored, in addition to records relating to tobacco or cannabis consumption or preparation.

In 2024, Guinness World Records was accused of laundering the reputation of the oppressive governments as it set world records for the UAE's police forces and Egypt's military. By 2024, the UAE achieved 526 records, of which 21 were credited to the Emirates' police force. Matthew Hedges, a British academic who was forced to sign a false confession, asked the records body to take down the Abu Dhabi police department's certificate for "most signatures on a scroll", along with other such titles. Concerns were also raised around the activities around Egypt, which moved from 22 records to 110 within a decade until 2024. James Lynch, co-founder of FairSquare, said the records were legitimizing Abdel Fattah el-Sisi's regime. The Guinness World Records stated that its record titles "cannot be purchased".

Guinness World Records has been accused of romanticizing diseases, such as Graves' disease and Pica.

=== Difficulty in defining records ===
For some potential categories, Guinness World Records has declined to list some records that are too difficult, subjective, or impossible to determine. For example, its website states: "We do not accept any claims for beauty as it is not objectively measurable." Similarly, it also rejected musical records such as "fastest violin player" because it's deemed "impossible to judge if all notes are being played correctly, even when recordings are slowed down".

== Change in business model ==
Traditionally, the company made a large amount of its revenue via book sales to interested readers, especially children. The rise of the Internet began to cut into book sales starting in the 2000s, part of a general decline in the book industry. According to a 2017 story by Planet Money of NPR, Guinness began to realize that a lucrative new revenue source to replace falling book sales was the would-be record-holders themselves. While any person can theoretically send in a record to be verified for free, the approval process is slow. Would-be record breakers that paid fees ranging from US$12,000 to US$500,000 would be given advisors, adjudicators, help in finding good records to break as well as suggestions for how to do it, prompt service, and so on. In particular, corporations and celebrities seeking a publicity stunt to launch a new product or draw attention to themselves began to hire Guinness World Records, paying them for finding a record to break or to create a new category just for them. As such, they have been described as a native advertising company, with no clear distinction between content and advertisement.

Television talk show host John Oliver criticized Guinness World Records on the programme Last Week Tonight with John Oliver in August 2019, during an episode about Gurbanguly Berdimuhamedow, the President of Turkmenistan. Oliver said Guinness took money from authoritarian governments for pointless vanity projects such as Berdimuhamedow's. Oliver asked Guinness to work with Last Week Tonight to adjudicate a record for "Largest cake featuring a picture of someone falling off a horse", but according to Oliver, the offer did not work out after Guinness insisted on a non-disparagement clause. (Oliver made the cake anyway and shared it with the studio audience at the end of the segment.) Guinness World Records denied the accusations and stated that they declined Oliver's offer to participate because "it was merely an opportunity to mock one of our record-holders," and that Oliver did not specifically request the record for the largest marble cake. As of 2021, the Guinness World Record for "Largest marble cake" remains with Betty Crocker Middle East in Saudi Arabia. Following Oliver's episode, Guinness World Records' ethics were called into question by human rights groups.

== Museums ==
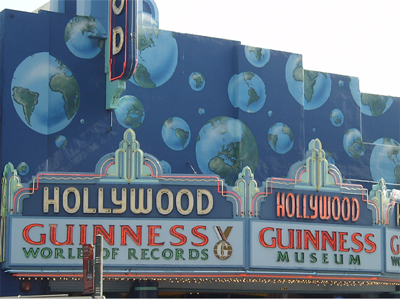
Guinness Museum in the Hollywood Theater in Hollywood, California

In 1976, a Guinness Book of World Records museum opened in the Empire State Building. Speed shooter Bob Munden then went on tour promoting The Guinness Book of World Records by performing his record fast draws with a standard weight single-action revolver from a Western movie-type holster. His fastest time for a draw was 0.02 seconds. Among exhibits were life-size statues of the world's tallest man, Robert Wadlow, and world's largest earthworm, an X-ray photo of a sword swallower, repeated lightning strike victim Roy Sullivan's hat complete with lightning holes and a pair of gem-studded golf shoes on sale for $6,500. The museum closed in 1995.

In more recent years, the Guinness company has permitted the franchising of small museums with displays based on the book, all currently (as of 2010) located in towns popular with tourists: Tokyo, Copenhagen, San Antonio. There were once Guinness World Records museums and exhibitions at the London Trocadero, Bangalore, San Francisco, Myrtle Beach, Orlando, Atlantic City, and Las Vegas. The Orlando museum, which closed in 2002, was branded The Guinness Records Experience; the Hollywood, Niagara Falls, Copenhagen, and Gatlinburg museums also previously featured this branding.

== Television series ==
Guinness World Records has commissioned various television series documenting world record breaking attempts, including:

Country	Name	Network	Broadcast	Hosts
Arab World	العرب في موسوعة جينيس; Arabs in the Guinness Book of Records	Al Dar 1	2021	Turki Al Omari; George Kurdahi
Australia	Australia's Guinness World Records	Seven Network	2005	Grant Denyer; Shelley Craft
Australia	Australia Smashes Guinness World Records	Seven Network	2010	James Kerley
Bulgaria	Световните рекорди Гинес	bTV	2006–2007	Krasimir Vankov
China	The day of Guinness in China	CCTV	2006–2014	Wang Xuechun; Zhu Xun; Lin Hai
France	L'émission des records (1999–2002); L'été des records (2001)	TF1	1999–2002	Vincent Perrot
France	L'été de tous les records (2003–2005); 50 ans, 50 records (2004)	France 3	2003–2005	Pierre Sled
France	La nuit des records	France 2	2006	Olivier Minne; Adriana Karembeu
France	Le monde des records	W9	2008–2010	Alexandre Devoise; Karine Ferri
France	Les trésors du livre des records	Gulli	2015	Fauve Hautot; Willy Rovelli
Germany	Guinness World Records – Die größten Weltrekorde	RTL Television	2004–2008	Oliver Welke (2004); Oliver Geissen (2005–2008)
Greece	Guinness World Records	Mega Channel	2009–2011	Katerina Stikoudi (2009–2010); Kostas Fragkolias (2009–2010); Giorgos Lianos (2010–2011)
India	Guinness World Records – Ab India Todega	Colors TV	2011	Preity Zinta; Shabbir Ahluwalia
Italy	Lo show dei record	Canale 5	2006 (pilot); 2008–2012; 2015; 2022–2025	Barbara D'Urso (2006–2009); Paola Perego (2010); Gerry Scotti (2011, 2015, 2022–2025); Teo Mammucari (2012)
Italy	La notte dei record	TV8	2018	Enrico Papi
New Zealand	NZ Smashes Guinness World Records	TV2	2009	Marc Ellis
Philippines	Guinness Book of World Records Philippine Edition	ABC	2004	Cookie Calabig
Philippines	The Best Ka!	GMA Network	2022	Mikael Daez
Poland	Światowe Rekordy Guinnessa	Polsat	2009–2011	Maciej Dowbor
Portugal	Guinness World Records Portugal	SIC	2014	Rita Andrade; João Ricardo
Spain	El show de los récords	Antena 3	2001–2002	Mar Saura; Manu Carreño; Mónica Martínez
Spain	Guinness World Records	Telecinco	2009	Carmen Alcayde; Luis Alfonso Muñoz
Spain	La noche de los récords	Telecinco	2025	Jesús Vázquez
Sweden	Guinness rekord-TV	TV3	1999–2000	Mårten Andersson (1999); Linda Nyberg (1999); Harald Treutiger (2000); Suzanne Sjögren (2000)
United Kingdom	Record Breakers	BBC1	1972–2001	Roy Castle (1972–1993); Norris McWhirter (1972–1985); Ross McWhirter (1972–1975)
United Kingdom	Guinness World Records (UK)	ITV	1999–2001	Ian Wright; Kate Charman
United Kingdom	Ultimate Guinness World Records	Challenge	2004	Jamie Rickers
United Kingdom	Guinness World Records Smashed	Sky1	2008–2009	Steve Jones; Konnie Huq
United Kingdom	Totally Bonkers Guinness Book of Records	ITV2	2012–2015	Matt Edmondson
United Kingdom	Officially Amazing	CBBC	2013–2018	Ben Shires
United Kingdom	Guinness World Records Cymru	S4C (Wales)	2020–present	Alun Williams (2025); Rhianna Loren (2025)
United States	The Guinness Game	Syndicated	1979–1980	Bob Hilton; Don Galloway
United States	Guinness World Records Primetime	Fox	1998–2001	Cris Collinsworth; Mark Thompson
United States	Guinness World Records Unleashed / Gone Wild	truTV	2013–2014	Dan Cortese

Specials:

- Guinness World Records: 50 Years, 50 Records – on ITV (UK), 11 September 2004
- Guinness World Records Live: Top 100 – on NBC (US), February 2008

== Gamer's edition ==
In 2008, Guinness World Records released its gamer's edition, a supplement that keeps records for popular video game high scores, codes and feats in association with Twin Galaxies. The Gamer's Edition used to contain 258 pages, over 1,236 video game related world records and four interviews including one with Twin Galaxies founder Walter Day. Editions were published for the years 2008 through 2020, with the 2009 edition in hardcover. The 2025 edition is the first since 2020, returning after a five-year hiatus. Since 2020, the supplement has had 192 pages.

== The Guinness Book of British Hit Singles ==
The Guinness Book of British Hit Singles was a music reference book first published in 1977. It was compiled by BBC Radio 1 DJs Paul Gambaccini and Mike Read with brothers Tim Rice and Jonathan Rice. It was the first in a number of music reference books that were to be published by Guinness Publishing with sister publication The Guinness Book of British Hit Albums coming in 1983. After being sold to Hit Entertainment, the data concerning the Official Chart Company's singles and albums charts were combined under the title British Hit Singles & Albums, with Hit Entertainment publishing the book from 2003 to 2006 (under the Guinness World Records brand). After Guinness World Records was sold to The Jim Pattison Group, it was effectively replaced by a series of books published by Ebury Publishing/Random House with the Virgin Book of British Hit Singles first being published in 2007 and with a Hit Albums book following two years later.

== Other media and products ==
=== Board game ===
In 1975, Parker Brothers marketed a board game, The Guinness Game of World Records, based on the book. Players compete by setting and breaking records for activities such as the longest streak of rolling dice before rolling doubles, stacking plastic pieces, and bouncing a ball off alternating sides of a card, as well as answering trivia questions based on the listings in the Guinness Book of World Records.

=== Video games ===
A video game, Guinness World Records: The Videogame, was developed by TT Fusion and released for Nintendo DS, Wii and iOS in November 2008.

=== Film ===
In 2012, Warner Bros. announced the development of a live-action film version of Guinness World Records with Daniel Chun as scriptwriter. The film, however, never entered production.
