= Fredrik Jensen =

Fredrik Jensen may refer to:

- Fredrik Jensen (Waffen-SS member) (1921–2011), Norwegian member of the Waffen-SS
- Fredrik Jensen (footballer, born 1985), Swedish footballer
- Fredrik Oldrup Jensen (born 1993), Norwegian footballer
- Fredrik Jensen (footballer, born 1997), Finnish footballer
