= Fredrik Haga =

Finnish football executive and a former player (born 1962)

Personal information
- Date of birth: 1962 (age 63–64)
- Place of birth: Pietarsaari, Finland
- Position: Midfielder

Team information
- Current team: Jaro (sporting director)

Youth career
- Jaro

Senior career*
Years	Team	Apps	(Gls)
1980–1987	Jaro		
- FinnPa
- HPS

Managerial career
- 1992: HIFK (team manager)
- 1993–1994: HIFK
- 1995–1996: HIFK (youth)
- 1997: HIFK
- 1999: Honka (assistant)
- HIFK (academy director)
- HIFK (club director)
- HIFK (CEO)
- 2017–2022: Jaro (CEO)
- 2025–2025: Jaro (sporting director)
- * Club domestic league appearances and goals as of 28 March 2025

Fredrik Haga (born 1962) is a Finnish football executive, football manager and a former player who played as a midfielder, at was latest working as of 2025 as a sporting director of FF Jaro in Veikkausliiga.

He was the CEO and the club director of his hometown club Jaro, the club which he also represented as a player, having left his position previously in October 2022. Haga represented Jaro, FinnPa and Helsingin Palloseura during his playing career and later transitioned into management roles, including working for clubs like HIFK and Honka. He has extensive experience in Finnish football, both on and off the field, having both managed and directed several teams over the years
