= Vs. the Snow =

2007 studio album by the LK

Studio album by The LK
- Released: April 4, 2007
- Genre: Indie pop, electronic music
- Length: 42:37
- Label: (Sweden) Songs I Wish I Had Written / (United States) The Kora Records

The LK chronology
The Private Life of a Cat EP (2006)	Vs. the Snow (2007)

Professional ratings
Review scores
Source	Rating
Pitchfork Media	(7.9/10)

Vs. the Snow is the first full-length album by the Malmö, Sweden-based indie pop band The LK. It was released on April 4, 2007, with a U.S. reissue on March 4, 2008.

The album has eleven songs with a dreamlike atmosphere, expressed by loops and minimal sounds. The album builds upon the foundations of the band's earlier work – clean song craft, simple melodies and Scandinavian melancholy.

== Track listing ==
1. "Anorak and Other Complicated Words Beginning With An A" - 1:39
2. "Eurovision" - 4:32
3. "Tamagotchi Freestyle" - 3:44
4. "Down By Law" - 4:08
5. "Stop Being Perfect" - 3:46 (US release only)
6. "Private Life of a Cat" - 3:40
7. "Tandem Bikes" - 4:19
8. "Transistor Tropics" - 5:16
9. "The Love of Little Things" - 3:25
10. "Blakboy Vs. The Snow" - 4:20
11. "Yellow Ribbons" - 4:32
