= Moonbabies at the Ballroom =

Studio album by Moonbabies
- Released: 2007
- Genres: Dream pop, indie pop, indie electronic
- Length: 42:54
- Label: Startracks / Hidden Agenda Records
- Producers: Ola Frick & Carina Johansson

Moonbabies chronology
The Orange Billboard (2004)	Moonbabies at the Ballroom (2007)

Professional ratings
Review scores
Source	Rating
Allmusic	3.5/5 stars
Spin	3.5/5 stars
Musiklandet	4/5 stars
PopMatters	4/10

Moonbabies at the Ballroom is the Moonbabies third full-length album, released in 2007.

== Track listing ==
1. 21st Century Heart - 2:26
2. War on Sound - 3:45
3. Take Me to the Ballroom - 3:57
4. Don't Ya Know? - 3:51
5. Cocobelle - 4:02
6. Ratatouille - 1:25
7. Walking on My Feet - 3:57
8. Shout It Out - 3:46
9. The 9th - 4:23
10. Weekend A-Go-Go - 5:57
11. Dancing in the Sky - 5:25
