= Gessie villastad =

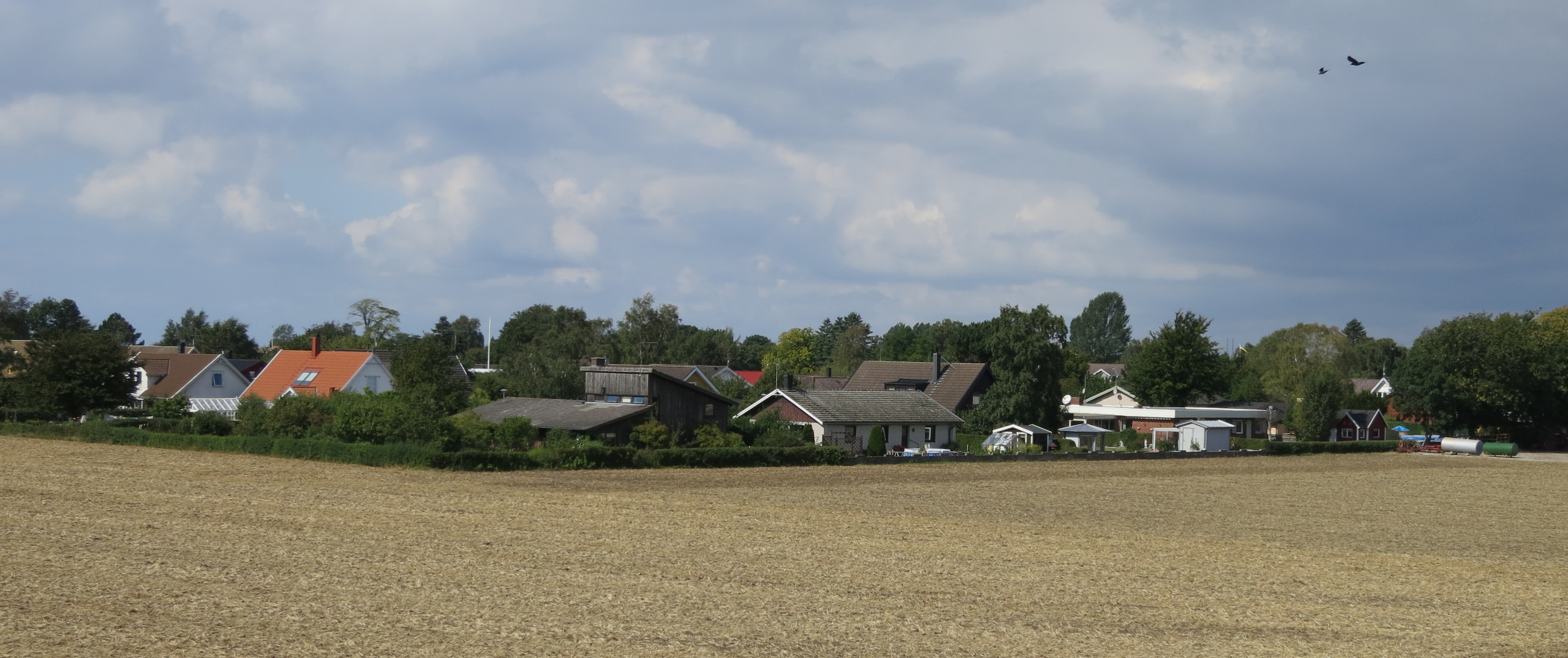
- A photo of Gessie villastad

- Location within Skåne Location within Sweden
- Coordinates: 55°30′N 12°58′E
- Country: Sweden
- Province: Skåne
- County: Skåne County
- Municipality: Vellinge Municipality

Area
  - Total: 0.44 km^{2} (0.17 sq mi)

Population (31 December 2010)
  - Total: 497
  - Density: 1,121/km^{2} (2,900/sq mi)
- Time zone: UTC+1 (CET)
  - Summer (DST): UTC+2 (CEST)

Gessie villastad is a locality situated in Vellinge Municipality, Skåne County, Sweden with 497 inhabitants in 2010.
