= The Orange Billboard =

Studio album by Moonbabies
- Released: 2004
- Genre: Dream Pop, Indie Pop, Indie electronic
- Length: 48:17
- Label: Startracks / Hidden Agenda Records
- Producer: Ola Frick & Carina Johansson

Moonbabies chronology
June and Novas (2001)	The Orange Billboard (2004)	Moonbabies at the Ballroom (2007)

Professional ratings
Review scores
Source	Rating
Allmusic	4/5 stars
Tiny Mix Tapes	4/5 stars

The Orange Billboard is the Moonbabies second full-length album, released in 2004. Under the Radar Magazine, in September 2014, stating that The Orange Billboard “...still stands as one of the best albums the genre may have ever seen.”

== Track listing ==
1. Fieldtrip USA - 4:50
2. Sun A.M. - 5:26
3. Over My Head - 3:47
4. Crime o' the Moon - 3:54
5. Jets - 3:51
6. Summer Kids Go - 5:02
7. Forever Changes Everything Now - 5:10
8. Slowmono - 4:28
9. Wyomi - 1:42
10. The Orange Billboard - 7:07
11. You Know How It Is - 3:00
