= Suzanne Sjögren =

Swedish sports journalist and television presenter (born 1974)

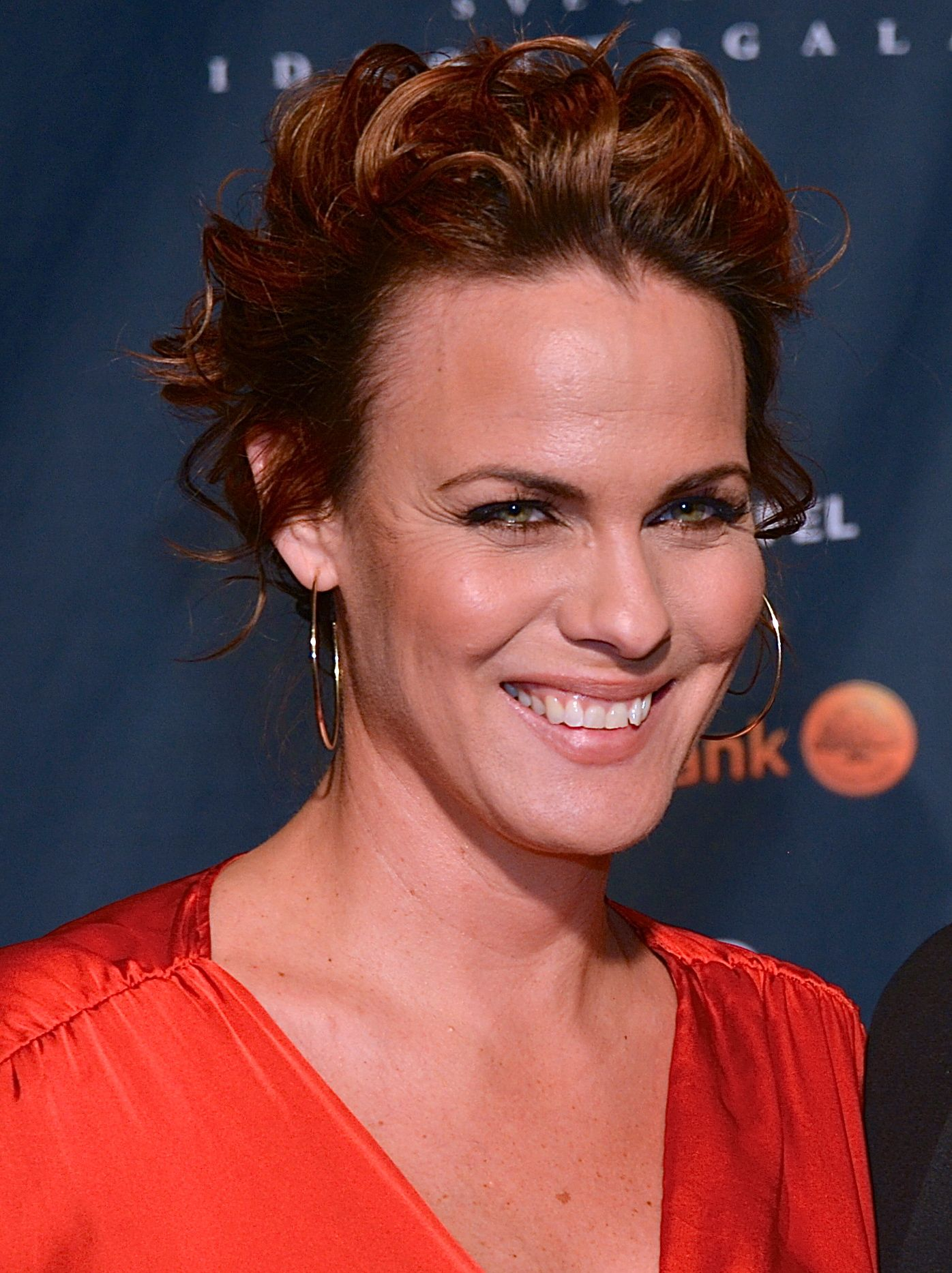
- Sjögren in 2013
- Born: Suzanne Leila Sjögren Jensen; 27 May 1974 (age 52); Vellinge, Sweden
- Occupation: Television presenter
- Known for: Sports programmes, Fotbollsgalan

Suzanne Leila Sjögren Jensen (born 27 May 1974) is a Swedish sports journalist and television presenter who works for TV4. She has presented the broadcast for several major sporting events, mainly on TV4.

== Biography ==
Sjögren started her career at SVT with the local news Sydnytt and then the children's sports show Lilla Sportspegeln. She was employed by TV3 in 1999 where she presented the ice hockey world cup for four years. She also presented entertainment shows like Världens starkaste man, Guinness rekord-tv and matches from the Champions League.

In 2003, she was employed by TV4. She has since presented and worked on the broadcasts for the UEFA Cup in 2004 in Portugal and the 2006 FIFA world cup in Germany. Sjögren is also noted for covering women's football. She presented the broadcasts for FIFA women's World Cup in the US in 2003 which was seen by 3.8 million Swedish viewers, she also worked on the 2011 FIFA women's World Cup in Germany. She has also broadcast from Spanish league La Liga, and the finals of the Swedish Ice Hockey League. She has presented Fotbollsgalan twice, in 2003 along with Rickard Olsson and Rickard Sjöberg and in 2005 along with Jessica Almenäs. In 2005 the gala was broadcast from Hovet in Stockholm. Sjögren and Almenäs were praised for being the first female duo to present the gala.

In 2010, Sjögren presented the indoor world championships in Qatar, the Diamond League broadcasts and the athletics world championships in Barcelona. She has also presented Nyhetsmorgon.

In 2009, Sjögren won a celebrity edition of the TV3 show Singing Bee, winning 50,000 (SEK) for the charity MinStoraDag.

Sjögren was elected as Sweden's sexiest woman by the men's magazine Slitz in 2001.
