= The LK =

Swedish indie band

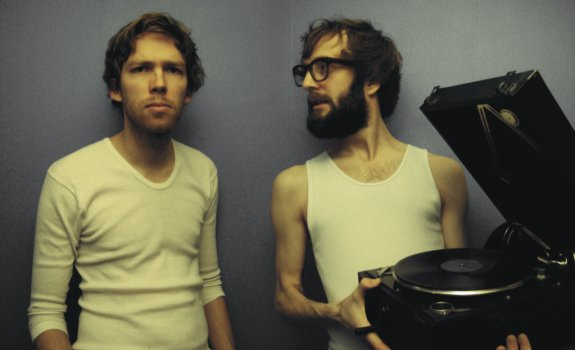

Background information
- Also known as: "LK", "The Love of Kevin, Colour, Chaos and the Sound of K", "The Lovekevins"
- Origin: Malmö, Sweden
- Genres: Indie pop, Electronic music
- Years active: 2005-present
- Labels: The Kora Records, Songs I Wish I Had Written
- Members: Lindefelt, Fredrik
- Website: http://www.thelkhideout.com/

The LK is an experimental indie band from Malmö, Sweden. LK is short for the Lovekevins, the band's name before the 2008 USA release of Vs. the Snow, and shortened from their first band name, The Love of Kevin, Colour, Chaos and the Sound of K.

The band is a duo of Lindefelt, a sound artist, and Fredrik, a songwriter. Both perform solo and also run a microlabel called POL. They play melodic, electronic indie rock built from unlikely instrumental takes, noise and chunks of acoustic sound. They have been mentioned in Spin, Stereogum, Pitchfork Media and elsewhere, and have toured in Sweden, Norway, Germany, England and the United States.

Their album, Vs. the Snow, was released in 2007 and in the US on March 4, 2008.

== Discography ==
=== Albums ===
- Vs. the Snow (2007) Songs I Wish I Had Written / The Kora Records

=== EPs ===
- Max Léon (2005) Songs I Wish I Had Written
- Blame the English (2005) Songs I Wish I Had Written
- Private Life of a Cat (2006) Songs I Wish I Had Written
