= Maud Bernhagen =

Swedish sports journalist

Maud Bernhagen (born Maud Bergström, 13 August 1969 in Nyhem, Jämtland) is a Swedish sports journalist and television presenter who works for TV4. Along with Peppe Eng, she presented Fotbollsgalan 2002. After graduation, she worked at the newspaper Östersundsposten. She started to work at Jämtland's local TV4 station in 1994 and at TV4 Sporten's sports news show in 1995.
