= Moonbabies (band) =

Swedish pop duo

- Origin: Malmö, Sweden
- Genres: Electropop, indie pop, dream pop, alternative pop
- Years active: 1997–present
- Labels: Startracks, Duckweed, Culture Hero, Chalksounds, Hidden Agenda
- Members: Ola Frick; Carina Johansson
- Website: moonbabiesmusic.com

Moonbabies is a Swedish bubblegum pop duo formed in 1997 by Ola Frick (Vocals, guitar and various instruments) and Carina Johansson (Vocals and keyboards).

== History ==
The duo formed in 1997. Their debut album June and Novas was released in 2000 and they went on a U.S. tour in the spring of 2001. Their second album was released in 2004 and was followed by a European tour in 2004. After the release the album Moonbabies at the Ballroom in 2007, they went on hiatus until 2015 when they released Wizards on the Beach. Their music was shoegaze inspired but later progressed into a more pop and electronic sound.

== Discography ==
=== Albums ===
- Wizards on the Beach (2015)
- Moonbabies at the Ballroom (2007)
- The Orange Billboard (2004)
- June and Novas (2000)

=== Singles ===
- 24' / 'The Ocean Kill' (Digital Single) (2014)
- Chorus' / 'Raindrops' (Digital Single) (2014)
- Take me to the Ballroom (Single) (2007)
- War on Sound (Single) (2007)
- War on Sound Mini Album (2005)
- Forever Changes Everything Now (Single) (2004)
- Sun A.M. (Single) (2004)
- Standing on the Roof/Filtering the Daylight EP (7" Vinyl) (2002) Limited to 500 numbered copies
- We're Layabouts EP (2001)
- I'm Insane But so are You (7" Vinyl) (2000)
- Air>>>Moon>>>Stereo EP (7" Vinyl) (1999)

== Reception ==
The group has generally received positive to mixed reviews. Their song Sun A.M. was called "a sugary treat" by FingerTips. Exclaim praised some of their songs in the album The Orange Billboard but claimed it was a "missed opportunity" and had filler tracks. PopMatters gave the EP War on Sound Mini Album a positive review with a score of 7 but later gave the full album Moonbabies at the Ballroom a 4 claiming it "made for a peaceful listen" but had "no lasting qualities whatsoever."
