= Friðrik =

Friðrik [ˈfrɪðˌrɪːk] is a masculine Icelandic given name. Notable people with the name include:

- Friðrik Dór (born 1988), Icelandic singer and songwriter
- Friðrik Þór Friðriksson (born 1953), Icelandic film director
- Friðrik Ólafsson (1935–2025), Icelandic chess Grandmaster and president of FIDE
- Friðrik Ómar (born 1981), Icelandic singer, who represented Iceland in the Eurovision Song Contest 2008
- Friðrik Sophusson (born 1943), Icelandic politician, director of Icelandic state-run energy firm Landsvirkjun
