= Ferdinand Frick =

Swedish sculptor

Ferdinand Frick (1878 in Kopparberg – 1939 in São Paulo) was a Swedish sculptor of bronze sculpture of the Art Deco period.
