= Ljunghusen =

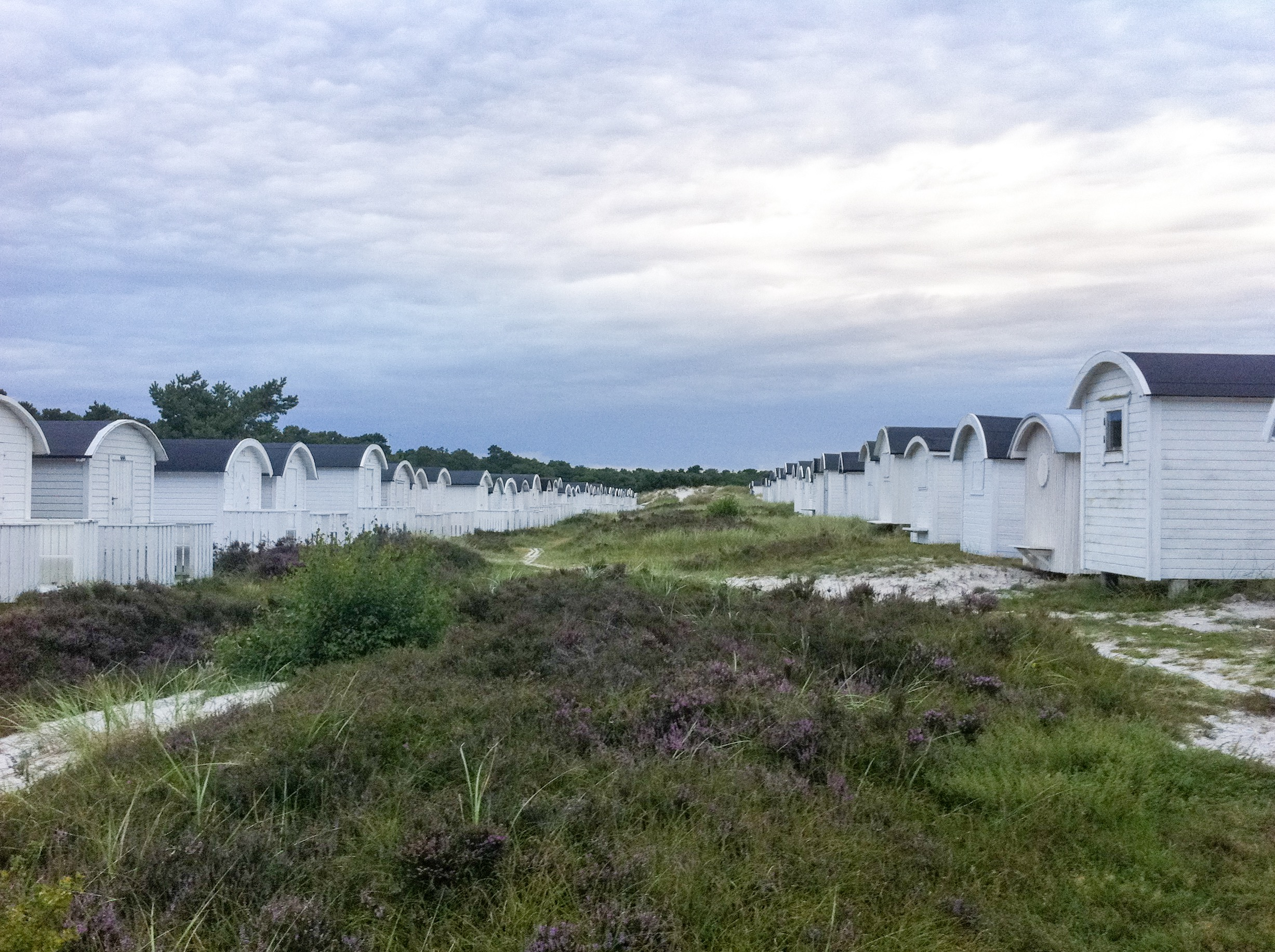
- Beach huts by Ljunghusen beach

- Location within Skåne Location within Sweden
- Coordinates: 55°24′N 12°55′E
- Country: Sweden
- Province: Skåne
- County: Skåne County
- Municipality: Vellinge Municipality

Area
  - Total: 3.81 km^{2} (1.47 sq mi)

Population (31 December 2010)
  - Total: 2,555
  - Density: 670/km^{2} (1,700/sq mi)
- Time zone: UTC+1 (CET)
  - Summer (DST): UTC+2 (CEST)

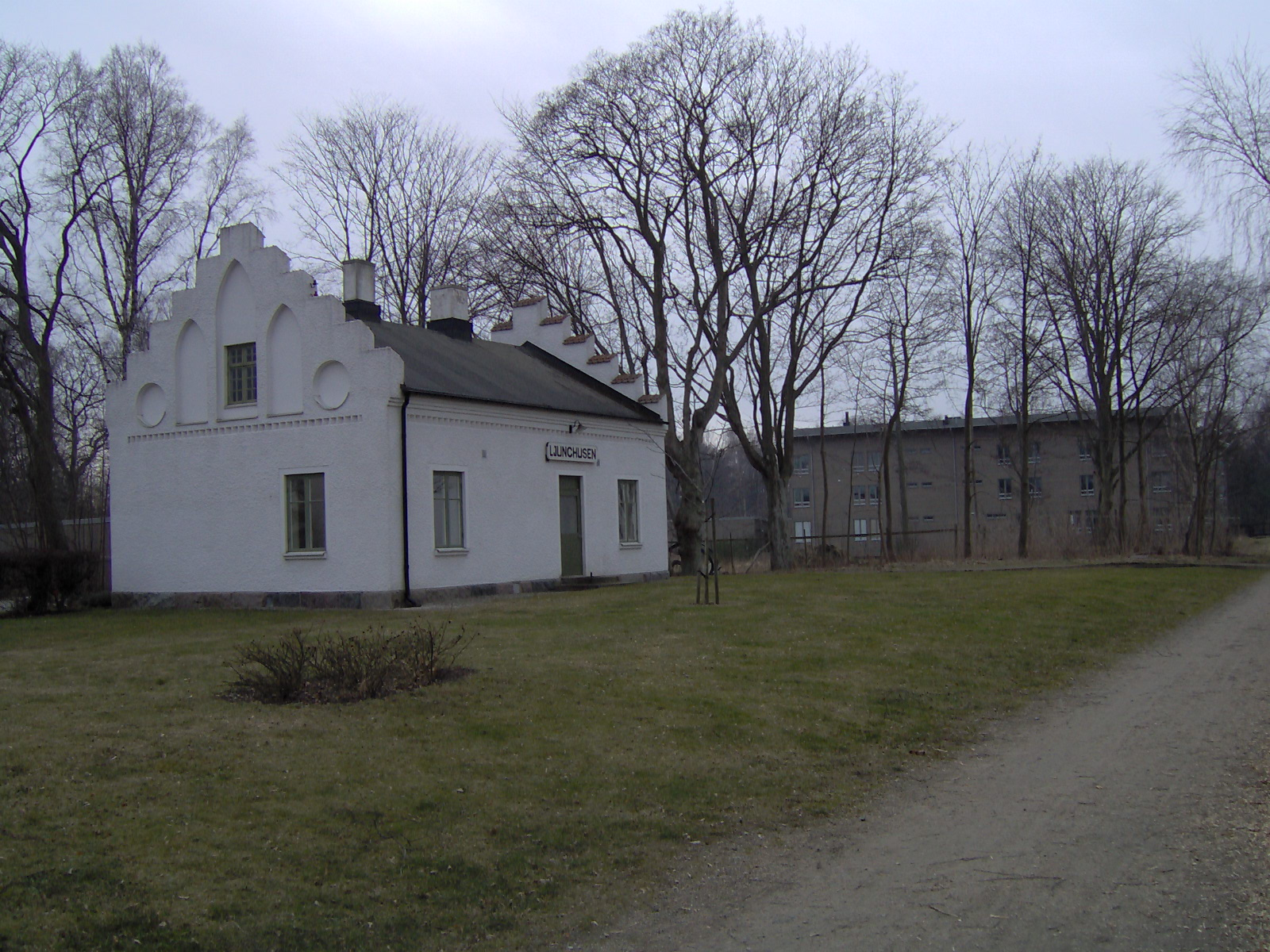
Train station, the track went on the road visible in the foreground.

Ljunghusen is a locality situated in Vellinge Municipality, Skåne County, Sweden with 2,555 inhabitants in 2010. It is located west of Höllviken and east of Skanör-Falsterbo. The town is notable for its beaches and for its golf course, Ljunghusens GK, which on several occasions has been ranked among Sweden's five best courses.

Ljunghusen had a train station between 1904 and 1971, and between 1905 and 1924 a horsetrack went from the train station in the north of the village to the beach in the south.

== Etymology ==
Ljunghusen The town has been named after two houses built in the beginning of the 19th century, north of the main road to Skanör-Falsterbo, approximately a little south of the former railway station house. These two houses had their own chapter "Ljunghusen" (The heather houses) in the parish register already 1837. Heather house with reference to the large big heath covered with heather, "Skanörs Ljung", today a nature reserve. The two houses are long since gone.

The Norra and Södra Ljunghuset Along the western limit of the town but in the neighbour parish Skanör-Falsterbo there were and are still today two old houses Norra Ljunghuset (Northern Heather house) built 1796 and Södra Ljunghuset (Southern Heather house) built 1850 . The two houses were built by Skanör-Falsterbo as lodges for gate keepers and cattle shepherds, along their eastern town limit straight across the heath, one at the main road in the north and the other close to the sea in the south.

The Norra Ljunghuset, used to be the last building before the heath between the town and Skanör-Falsterbo. Today, the town has expanded, but the house is still the last building along the main road to Skanör-Falsterbo. At the turn of the century, a speakeasy was also housed and active in the building and many stories were told about the heath's own troll, the so-called "Gya troll". Today there is a road named Lönnkrogsvägen (Speakeasy road) and there is also a residential area in the neighbour town Höllviken named "Gya". The Norra Ljunghuset burned down partly in 1950 but was repaired and is today home to a family.

Södra Ljunghuset, was used as a club house for the local golf club Ljunghusens GK, from the founding of the club in 1932 until the new club house was ready in 1965. Today, the house is used as a workshop for the club's greenkeepers. It also houses an apartment, that usually is occupied by someone employed by the golf club.

== The area ==
=== Ljungskogens strandbad ===
The part of Ljunghusen that can be reached through the Storvägen is called Ljungskogens strandbad. This is the westernmost part of the town. It has some unique features since there are only unpaved roads without street lights, and all the houses have very big lots, and previously there were rules how near the road the buildings could be built, and there is a general prohibition on making hammer noises during all the summer. All this gives the area a forestry feeling. Most of the unsettled lots in this area are being owned by persons who want to preserve the unique character of the area. However, in the latest years, a large number of these unsettled lots have been sold off. This has resulted in the increased new building of detached houses.

=== The area north of County Road 100 ===
North of the County Road 100 lies a grocery shop, a bakery, a former railway station and some apartments and terraced houses for the elderly and also a handful of detached houses.

=== The area between Ljungskogens strandbad and the channel ===
This area has a more classic suburban style, especially around the Elvabo road, where all the houses are identical and the road is relatively wide. The area is also illuminated by street lightning. Ljungsäter Hospital is found in this area, as well as the Hostel Lotsvillan.

== The Ljungsäter Hospital ==
The County Council in Lund constructed a tuberculosis sanatorium in Ljunghusen in 1921. This sanatorium was called the Ljungsäter Hospital. The name is derived from the Ljungsäter farm, which also has given its name to the road where the house lies today, the Ljungsäter Road. The hospital could take 110 patients and employed 20 persons, of which the majority came from the University Hospital in Lund. Patients could be picked up by a trolley at the railway siding from the railroad to Falsterbo, and at the same time it also transported beach bathers down, towards the hospital, which was close by the beach. The transport was a horse-drawn trolley, the same kind as the one used on the tracks in the Storvägsområdet. The hospital closed down when the Falsterbo channel was built in 1940. The reason was that the channel needed to be built through the building itself. The only remaining building in the hospital area is the Doctor's house, which is still being used today, although being very decayed.

== Transportation ==
Today, the transportation from Ljunghusen to Malmö are good. There are two bus stops in the area, and the buses comes every ten minutes during rush hours. At other times, the bus either stops at every 20th minute or every hour during slow hours. The stops are called Elvabovägen and Storvägen.

There was a railway station named "Ljunghusen" here between 1904 and 1971 and the station was part of the Hvellinge-Skanör-Falsterbo railroad. The railroad track was removed in 1971. There was also a horse-drawn tram going from the railroad station along "Storvägen" down to the beach where it was divided into two lines, one going east, the other one going west.

== The water tower in Ljunghusen ==
The water tower in Ljunghusen is also the town's water reservoir. The cylindrical-shaped tower is painted in white and it is located in the western part of the town, close to Skanörs ljung. The tower is about 40 m high and is also used to create water pressure for Höllviken. Before the Falsterbo water tower was constructed, it also used to serve Skanör-Falsterbo.

== External links and sources ==
Media related to Ljunghusen at Wikimedia Commons

- The cultural association Calluna, now and then in the Calluna
- PDF about the horse-drawn tram
- Lars Dufberg och Herbert Ekström - Från Skanör till Ljunghusen, en kavalkad i ord och bild, Falsterbo museum and Lions club Skanör-Falsterbo, 1977
