= Vellinge Municipality =

Vellinge Municipality Vellinge kommun
- Municipality
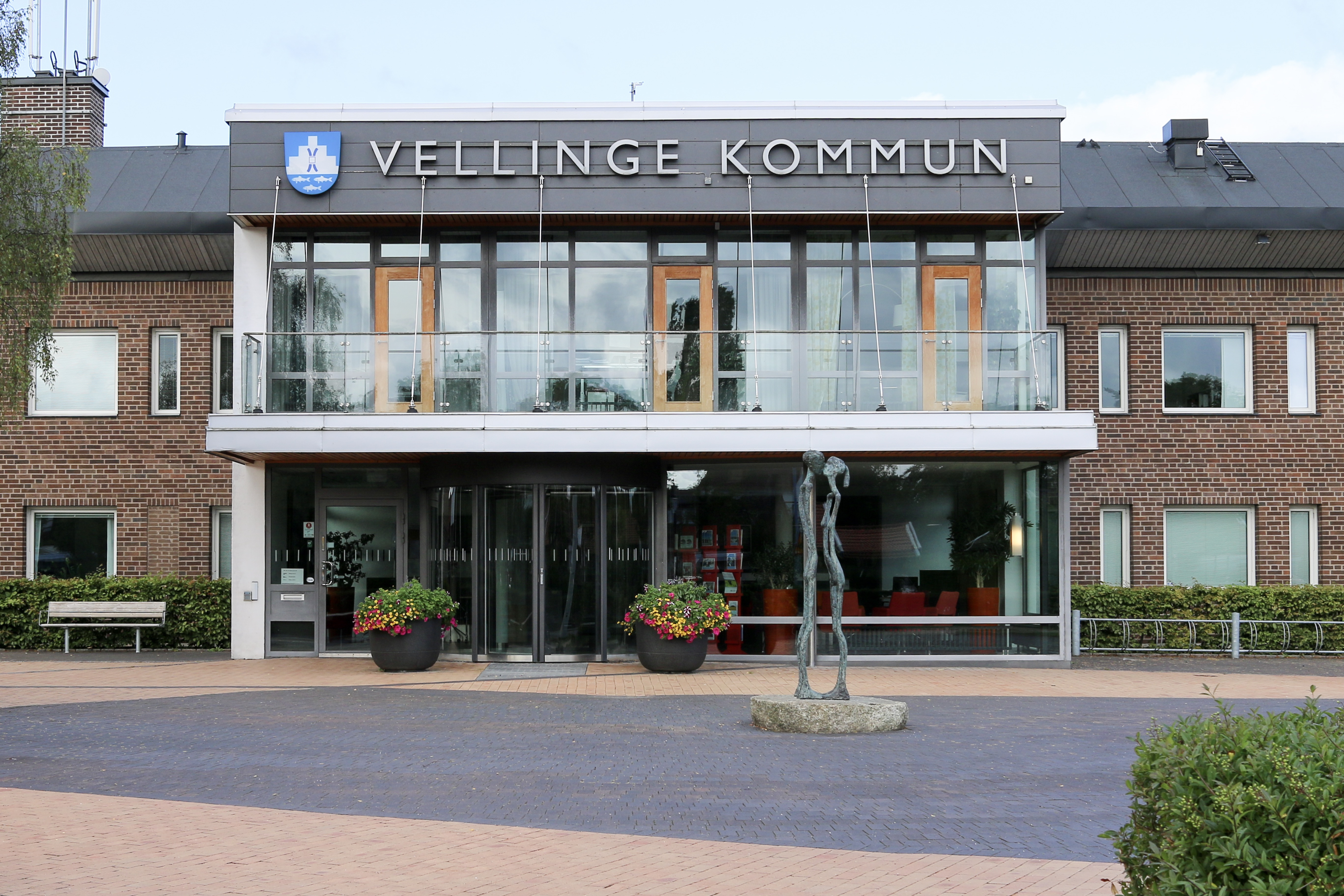
- Municipal Hall

- Coat of arms

- Coordinates: 55°28′N 13°01′E
- Country: Sweden
- County: Skåne County
- Seat: Vellinge

Area
  - Total: 705.46 km^{2} (272.38 sq mi)
  - Land: 142.61 km^{2} (55.06 sq mi)
  - Water: 562.85 km^{2} (217.32 sq mi)
- Area as of 1 January 2014.

Population (30 June 2025)
  - Total: 37,831
  - Density: 265.28/km^{2} (687.06/sq mi)
- Time zone: UTC+1 (CET)
  - Summer (DST): UTC+2 (CEST)
- ISO 3166 code: SE
- Province: Scania
- Municipal code: 1233
- Website: www.vellinge.se

Vellinge Municipality (Swedish: Vellinge kommun) is a municipality in Skåne County in southern Sweden. Its seat is located in Vellinge.

The present municipality is a result of the latest local government reform in Sweden. In 1974 the municipalities of Räng, Vellinge and Månstorp (all three created through amalgamation of even smaller units in 1952) amalgamated with the former Town of Skanör med Falsterbo to form a new Vellinge Municipality.

The municipality is considered to be one of the most economically well-off in Sweden, politically governed by a stable majority of the liberal conservative Moderate Party. Due to its low taxes, Vellinge Municipality is mainly populated by middle-class families, many commuting to Malmö.

== Localities ==
There were eight localities in the municipality in 2018.

Locality	Population
Höllviken and Ljunghusen	15,418
Skanör med Falsterbo	7,451
Vellinge	6,713
Hököpinge	1,327
Västra Ingelstad	878
Östra Grevie	771
Gessie villastad	533
Arrie	213

All of the urban areas are best characterized as affluent suburbs of the greater Malmö. Skanör-Falsterbo was an important medieval town.

== Demographics ==
This is a demographic table based on Vellinge Municipality's electoral districts in the 2022 Swedish general election sourced from SVT's election platform, in turn taken from SCB official statistics.

In total there were 37,428 residents, including 28,670 Swedish citizens of voting age. 24.4% voted for the left coalition and 74.9% for the right coalition. With this result, Vellinge was the strongest municipality in Sweden for the right bloc. Indicators are in percentage points except population totals and income.

Location	Residents	Citizen adults	Left vote	Right vote	Employed	Swedish parents	Foreign heritage	Income SEK	Degree
Location			%	%					
Falsterbo N	1,702	1,369	22.3	76.9	77	89	11	31,367	65
Falsterbo S	1,297	1,144	18.6	80.6	75	87	13	29,446	63
Hököpinge-Bruksp.	1,567	1,146	25.4	74.0	84	84	16	31,138	52
Hököpinge-Gessie	1,020	727	26.7	73.1	82	78	22	33,391	53
Höllviken Gya	1,709	1,290	25.8	74.0	83	91	9	36,025	60
Höllviken N	1,247	1,051	26.8	72.7	80	85	15	27,397	48
Höllviken V-C	1,243	971	21.4	77.9	80	89	11	30,425	56
Höllviken Ö-C	1,483	1,119	22.7	77.1	85	91	9	35,631	62
Höllviken-Kämpinge	2,063	1,555	20.1	79.3	82	90	10	36,758	61
Höllviksstrand	1,855	1,464	17.0	82.8	76	87	13	37,797	67
Kronodal-Granviks	1,610	1,310	25.2	74.1	86	93	7	29,249	53
Ljunghusen V	1,496	1,199	14.4	84.9	73	87	13	37,803	68
Ljunghusen Ö	1,285	968	19.6	79.4	75	89	11	37,771	71
Räng	2,288	1,590	23.6	75.5	86	93	7	36,788	63
Skanör C	1,943	1,509	23.5	76.0	81	90	10	31,246	62
Skanör V	958	860	24.0	75.3	73	89	11	29,484	66
Skanör Ö	1,606	1,152	27.9	71.3	83	90	10	32,680	66
Vellinge C	1,135	858	30.3	68.3	78	84	16	25,781	36
Vellinge Eskilstorp	1,871	1,404	27.3	72.4	88	90	10	32,393	52
Vellinge Herrestorp	1,253	938	28.8	70.3	79	88	12	26,182	37
Vellinge S	1,339	967	21.2	78.1	85	92	8	33,718	48
Vellinge V	2,034	1,657	27.5	71.3	84	87	13	27,061	41
Västra Ingelstad	2,230	1,622	33.9	65.3	85	86	14	30,798	51
Östra Grevie	1,194	800	31.8	67.5	84	85	15	30,408	47
Source: SVT

== Elections ==
Below are the results listed from since the 1973 municipal reform. Between 1988 and 1998 the Sweden Democrats' results were not published by the SCB due to the party's small size nationwide. "Turnout" denotes the percentage of the electorate casting a ballot, but "Votes" only applies to valid ballots cast.

=== Riksdag ===
Year	Turnout	Votes	V	S	MP	C	L	KD	M	SD	ND
1973	95.3	10,703	1.0	33.5	0.0	29.3	7.5	0.3	27.7		
1976	95.9	13,847	1.0	29.6	0.0	20.2	15.0	0.3	33.8		
1979	95.3	14,493	0.8	27.6	0.0	11.5	14.3	0.2	44.9		
1982	95.1	15,122	1.0	29.2	1.3	10.6	6.6	0.5	51.0		
1985	94.3	16,544	0.7	27.1	1.2	7.1	16.0	0.0	47.8		
1988	92.0	17,404	1.0	26.9	5.0	6.5	12.9	1.3	45.3		
1991	92.9	18,792	0.7	20.9	1.9	3.9	8.8	5.1	49.6		7.6
1994	92.6	19,636	1.2	29.6	2.6	3.9	6.6	3.4	49.5		2.6
1998	88.1	19,501	2.4	24.6	1.8	2.5	3.8	10.8	50.0		
2002	87.6	20,179	1.4	23.8	1.9	2.3	18.3	7.8	38.5	3.3	
2006	89.5	21,383	1.1	16.8	1.9	3.7	8.8	5.6	55.9	4.2	
2010	90.8	22,614	0.9	9.4	3.4	4.3	8.7	6.2	59.1	7.0	
2014	91.4	23,522	1.0	12.0	3.6	4.3	7.9	4.6	48.6	16.5	
2018	93.1	25,360	1.3	10.6	2.2	7.2	7.3	7.5	39.6	23.6	

Blocs

This lists the relative strength of the socialist and centre-right blocs since 1973, but parties not elected to the Riksdag are inserted as "other", including the Sweden Democrats results from 1988 to 2006, but also the Christian Democrats pre-1991 and the Greens in 1982, 1985 and 1991. The sources are identical to the table above. The coalition or government mandate marked in bold formed the government after the election. New Democracy got elected in 1991 but are still listed as "other" due to the short lifespan of the party. "Elected" is the total number of percentage points from the municipality that went to parties who were elected to the Riksdag.

Year	Turnout	Votes	Left	Right	SD	Other	Elected
1973	95.3	10,703	**34.5**	64.5	0.0	1.0	99.0
1976	95.9	13,847	30.6	**69.0**	0.0	0.4	99.6
1979	95.3	14,493	28.4	**70.7**	0.0	0.9	99.1
1982	95.1	15,122	**30.2**	68.2	0.0	1.6	98.4
1985	94.3	16,544	**27.8**	70.9	0.0	1.3	98.7
1988	92.0	17,404	**32.9**	64.7	0.0	2.4	97.6
1991	92.9	18,792	21.6	**67.4**	0.0	11.0	96.6
1994	92.6	19,636	**33.4**	63.4	0.0	3.2	96.8
1998	88.1	19,501	**28.8**	67.1	0.0	4.1	95.9
2002	87.6	20,179	**27.1**	66.9	0.0	6.0	94.0
2006	89.5	21,383	19.8	**74.0**	0.0	6.2	93.8
2010	90.8	22,614	13.7	**78.3**	7.0	1.0	99.0
2014	91.4	23,522	**16.6**	65.4	16.5	1.5	98.5
