= Albert Frick (skier) =

Liechtenstein alpine skier (born 1949)

Albert Frick (born 6 June 1949) is a Liechtensteiner former alpine skier who competed in the 1968 Winter Olympics.
