= Ernst Frick (painter) =

Swiss painter

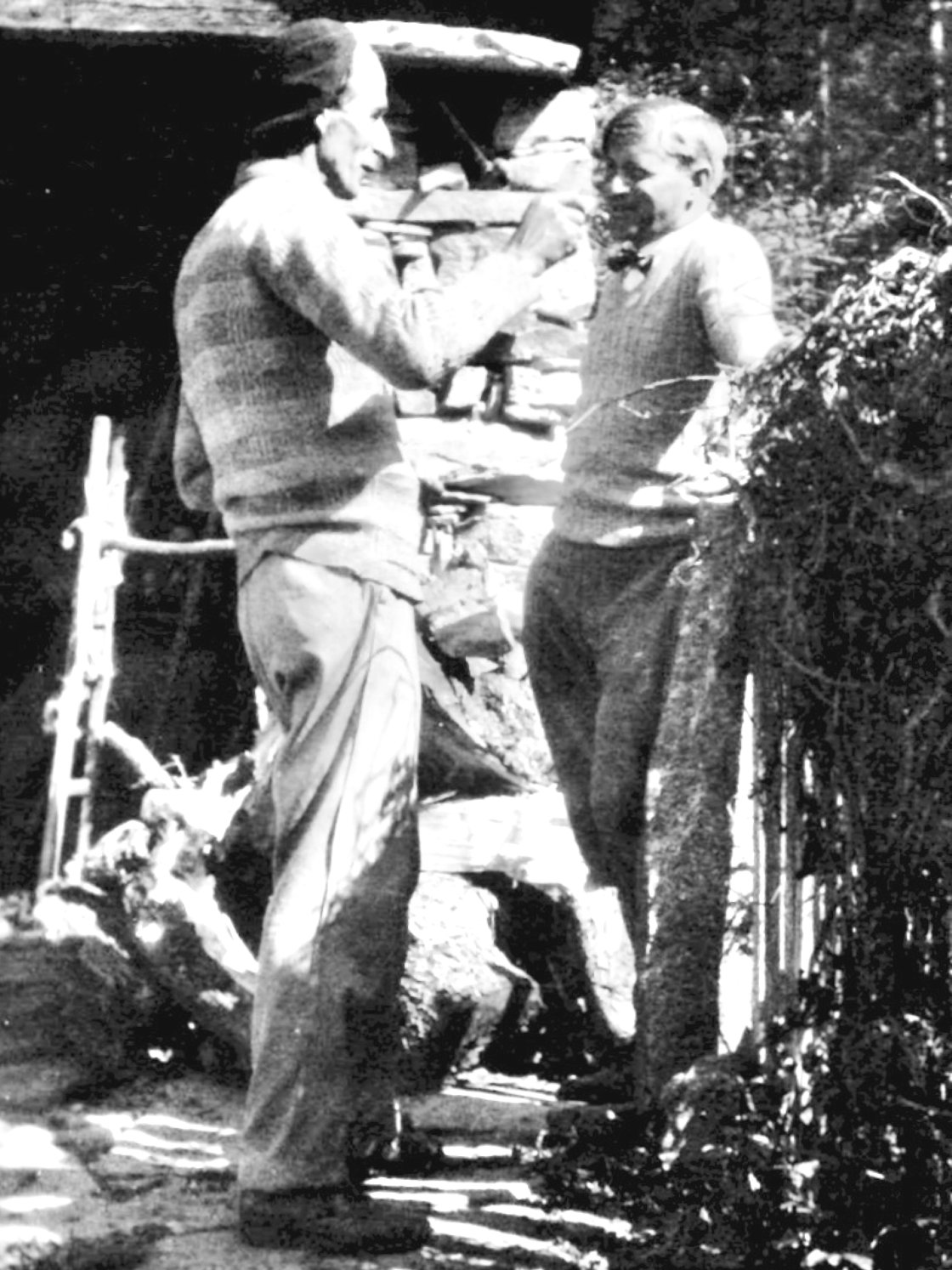
- Frick (left) in conversation with the progressive educator and chemist Paul Reiner
- Born: September 21, 1881; Knonau
- Died: August 23, 1956 (aged 74); Ascona
- Known for: Editor of Der Weckruf
- Movement: Der Große Bär
- Spouse: Margarethe Fellerer
- Partner: Frieda Gross-Schloffer

Ernst Frick (1881–1956) was a Swiss painter.

== Biography ==
Frick was born in Knonau, the son of a travelling salesman. Frick was a founder, who became a union member and then anarchist. He was editor of anarchist newspaper Weckruf (1904–1906). He served a year in prison (1912–1913) for his involvement in liberating a Russian anarchist from incarceration in Zurich. From 1911, he lived with Frieda Gross-Schloffer, wife of psychoanalyst Otto Gross, then from 1920, with photographer Margarethe Fellerer, whom he married in 1941. He became a painter at the urging of Artur Segal, and published essays on archaeology and the history of language.
