= Vellinge =

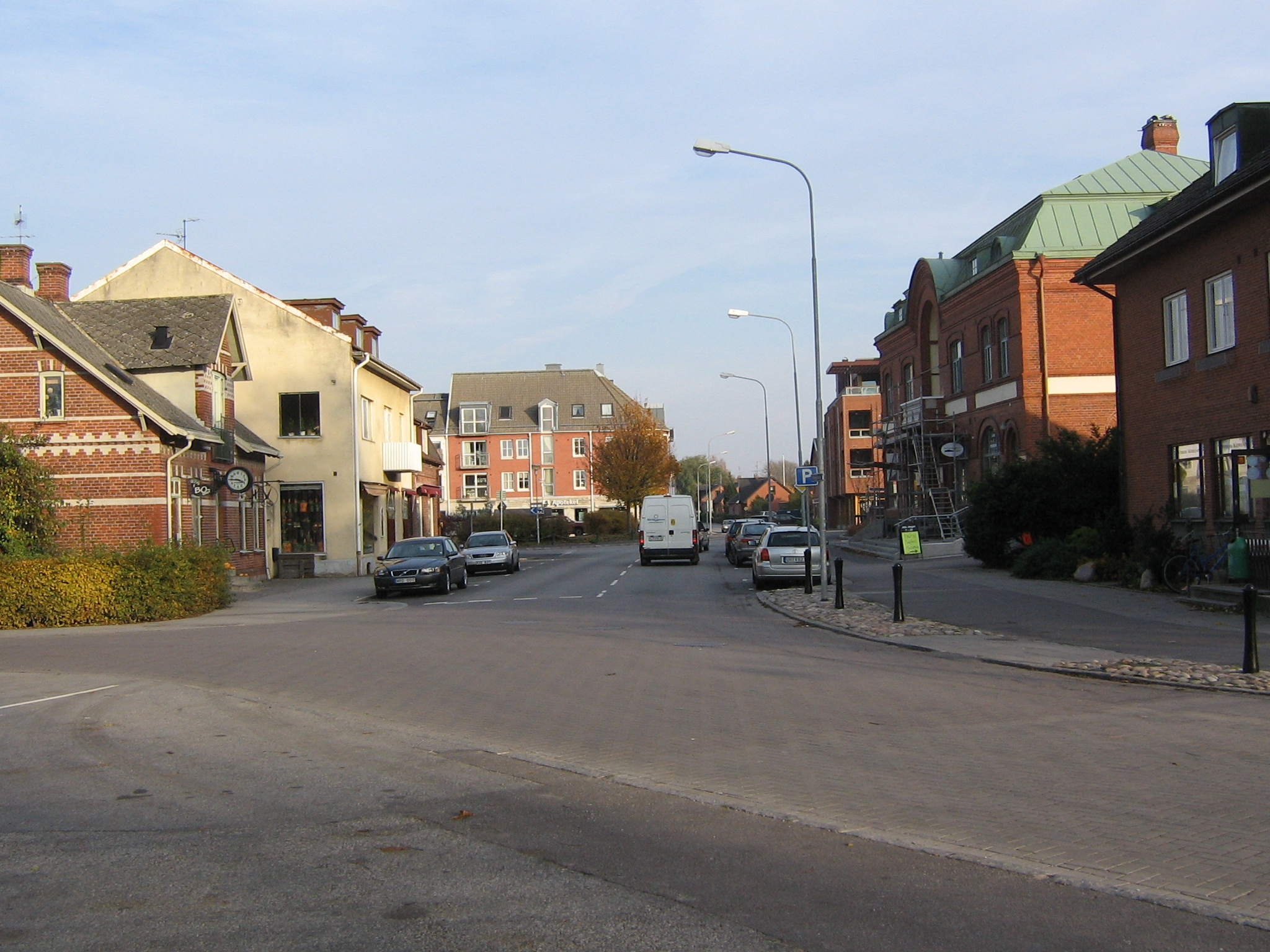
- Östergatan in Vellinge

- Coat of arms

- Location within Skåne Location within Sweden
- Coordinates: 55°28′N 13°01′E
- Country: Sweden
- Province: Skåne
- County: Skåne County
- Municipality: Vellinge Municipality

Area
  - Total: 3.17 km^{2} (1.22 sq mi)

Population (31 december 2019)
  - Total: 6,829
  - Density: 2,154/km^{2} (5,580/sq mi)
- Time zone: UTC+1 (CET)
  - Summer (DST): UTC+2 (CEST)

Vellinge is a locality and the seat of Vellinge Municipality, Skåne County, Sweden with 6,829 inhabitants in 2019.

It was ranked the second "best place to live" in Sweden - and the best in southern Sweden - in Fokus magazine's 2009 survey.
