= Ernst Frick (footballer) =

Swiss footballer

Personal information
- Date of birth: November 14, 1909
- Date of death: February 23, 1954 (aged 44)
- Position: Midfielder

Senior career*
Years	Team	Apps	(Gls)
- FC Luzern

International career
1934	Switzerland	1	(0)
- * Club domestic league appearances and goals

Ernst Frick (November 14, 1909 - February 23, 1954) was a Swiss footballer who played as a midfielder for Switzerland in the 1934 FIFA World Cup. He also played for FC Luzern. Frick is deceased.
