= List of cities in Sweden =

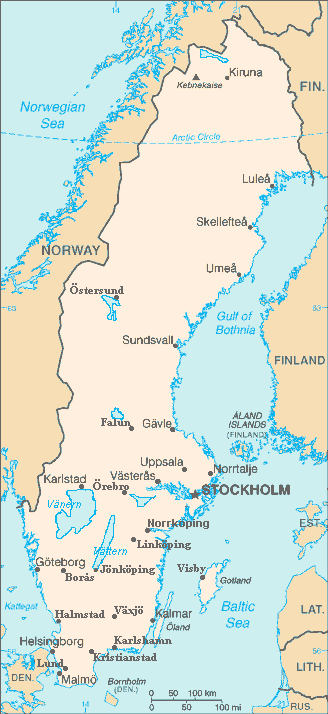
Map of Sweden

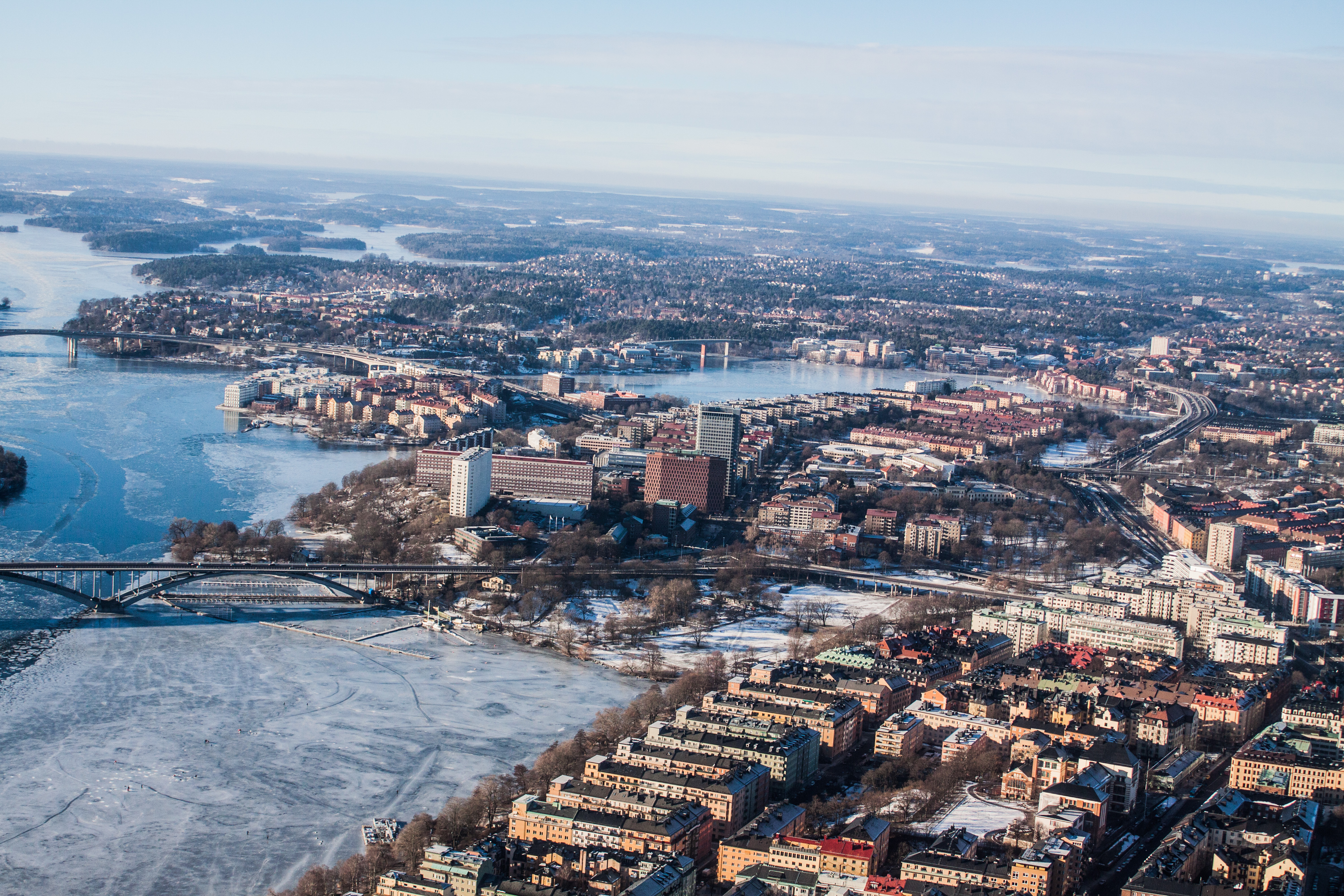
Stockholm, capital of Sweden

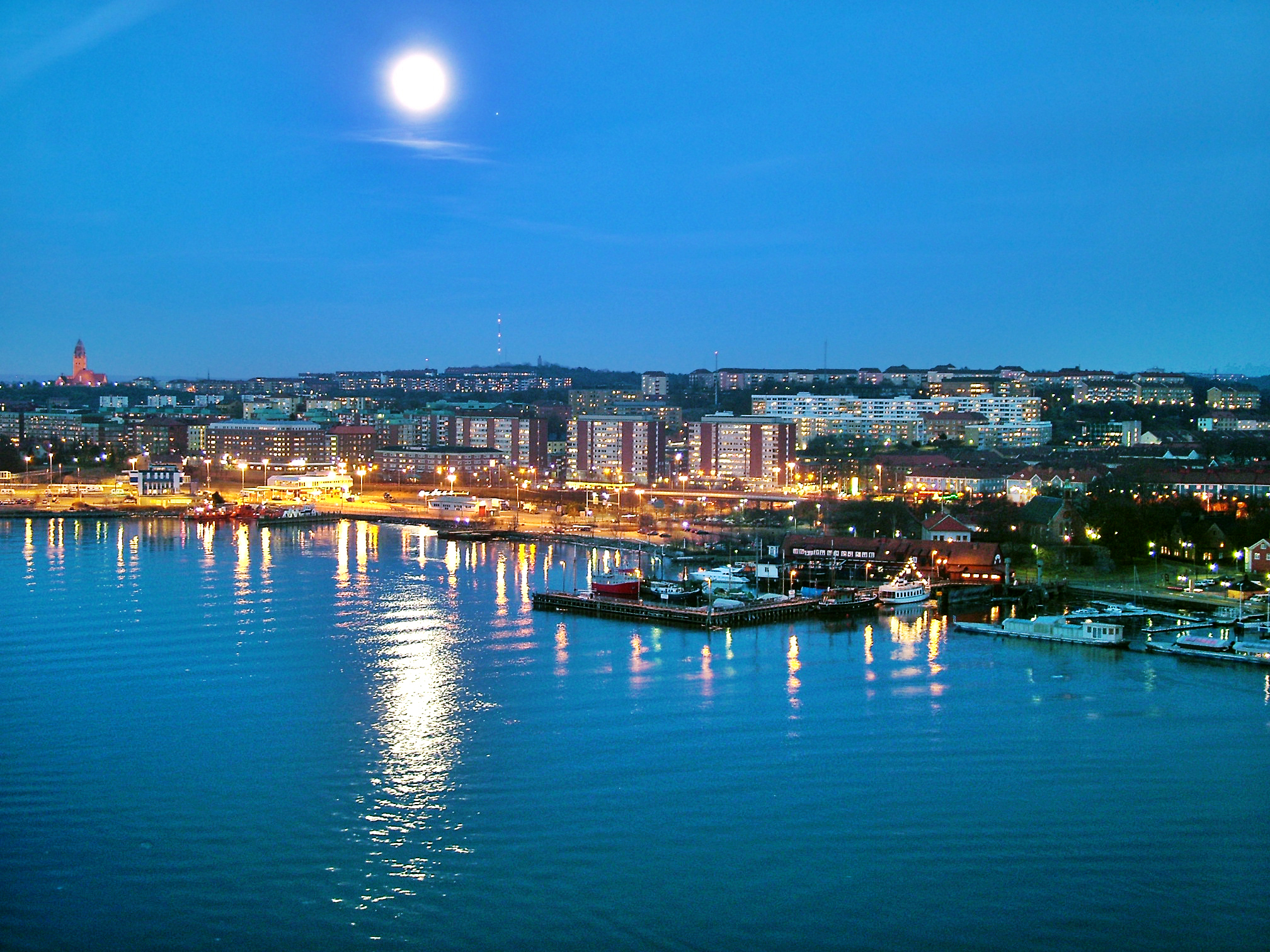
Gothenburg

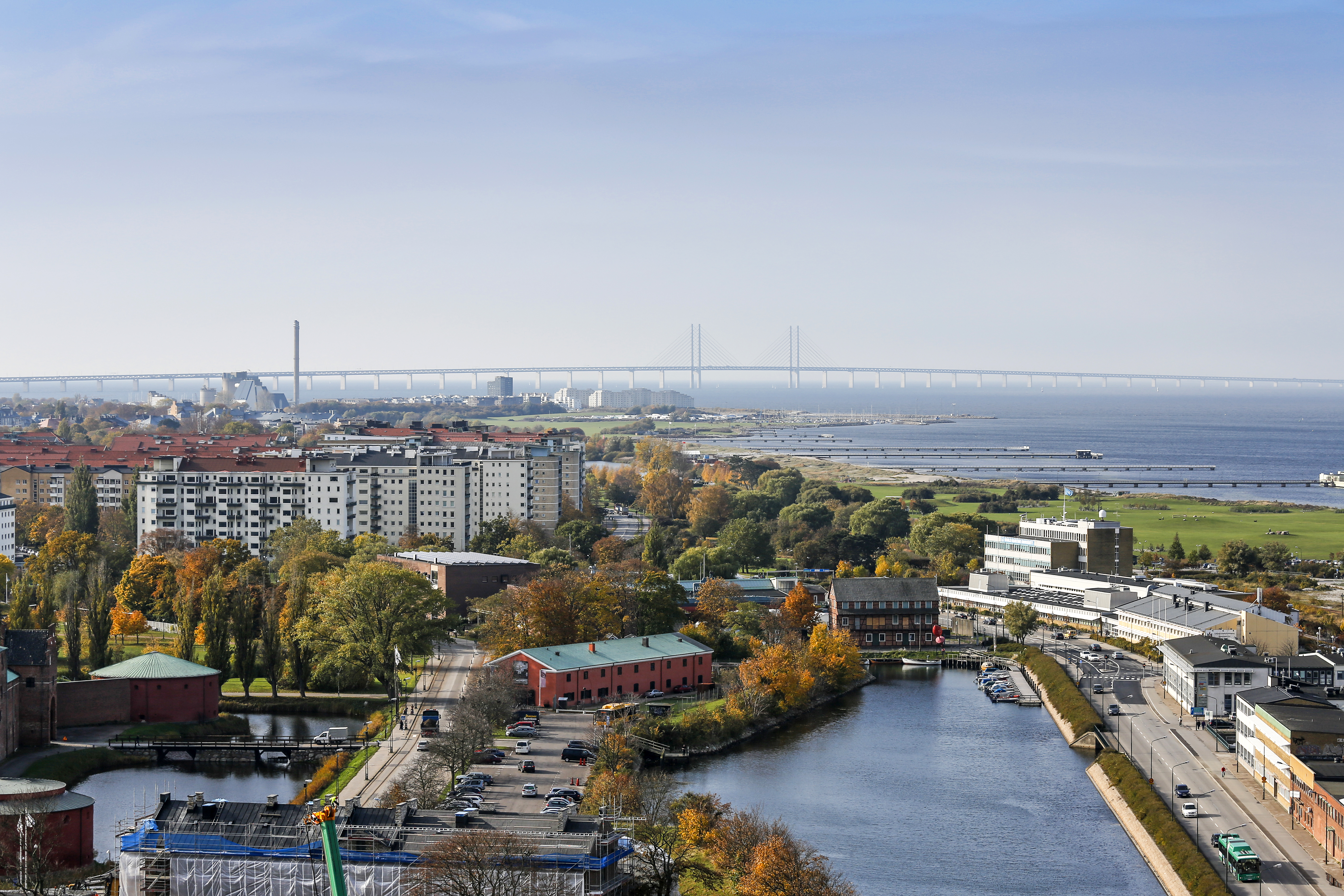
Malmö

This is a list of cities in modern Sweden that once enjoyed city privileges, thus were entitled to call themselves town (Swedish: stad, plural städer). The year indicates the year they were established or when they were granted a royal charter. The county indicates the county (län) of Sweden they are located in. The list does not include towns in Finland established during Swedish rule.

== Overview ==
Legally and administratively, the term stad is not used in Sweden since the municipal reform of 1971, when the municipality (kommun) became the only existing form of local government. Before the reform there were 132 urban centres (133 to 1966) that had the title of stad.

The urban centres of these municipalities are still called stad in daily speech and 14 of the municipalities have chosen to continue to call themselves stad in marketing situations, although several of them now encompass large rural areas following the merger of Swedish municipalities in the 1970s and 1980s. These 14 are: Borås Municipality, Gothenburg Municipality, Haparanda Municipality, Helsingborg Municipality, Landskrona Municipality, Lidingö Municipality, Malmö Municipality, Mölndal Municipality, Solna Municipality, Stockholm Municipality, Sundbyberg Municipality, Trollhättan Municipality, Vaxholm Municipality and Västerås Municipality.

The decision to call themselves stad has been taken purely for image and marketing reasons. In legal situations the word kommun (municipality) must be included in the municipality's name and governmental authorities will only refer to them by their legal names.

== List ==
City	Charter	County
Alingsås	1619	Västra Götaland
Arboga	1200	Västmanland
Arvika	1911	Värmland
Askersund	1643	Örebro
Avesta	1641–1686, 1919	Dalarna
Boden	1919	Norrbotten
Bollnäs	1942	Gävleborg
Borgholm	1816	Kalmar
Borlänge	1944	Dalarna
Borås	1622	Västra Götaland
Djursholm	1914	Stockholm
Eksjö	1400	Jönköping
Enköping	1300	Uppsala
Eskilstuna	1659	Södermanland
Eslöv	1911	Skåne
Fagersta	1944	Västmanland
Falkenberg	1558	Halland
Falköping	1200	Västra Götaland
Falsterbo	1200	Skåne
Falun	1641	Dalarna
Filipstad	1611-1694, 1835	Värmland
Flen	1949	Södermanland
Gothenburg	1619	Västra Götaland
Gränna	1652	Jönköping
Gävle	1446 (before)	Gävleborg
Hagfors	1950	Värmland
Halmstad	1200	Halland
Haparanda	1848	Norrbotten
Hedemora	1446 (before)	Dalarna
Helsingborg	1085	Skåne
Hjo	1400	Västra Götaland
Hudiksvall	1582	Gävleborg
Huskvarna	1911	Jönköping
Härnösand	1585	Västernorrland
Hässleholm	1914	Skåne
Höganäs	1936	Skåne
Jönköping	1284	Jönköping
Kalmar	1100	Kalmar
Karlshamn	1664	Blekinge
Karlskoga	1940	Örebro
Karlskrona	1680	Blekinge
Karlstad	1584	Värmland
Katrineholm	1917	Södermanland
Kiruna	1948	Norrbotten
Kramfors	1947	Västernorrland
Kristianstad	1622	Skåne
Kristinehamn	1582–1584, 1642	Värmland
Kumla	1942	Örebro
Kungsbacka	1400	Halland
Kungälv	1100	Västra Götaland
Köping	1474	Västmanland
Laholm	1200	Halland
Landskrona	1413	Skåne
Lidingö	1926	Stockholm
Lidköping	1446	Västra Götaland
Lindesberg	1643	Örebro
Linköping	1287	Östergötland
Ljungby	1936	Kronoberg
Ludvika	1919	Dalarna
Luleå	1621	Norrbotten
Lund	990	Skåne
Lycksele	1946	Västerbotten
Lysekil	1903	Västra Götaland
Malmö	1250	Skåne
Mariefred	1605	Södermanland
Mariestad	1583	Västra Götaland
Marstrand	1200	Västra Götaland
Mjölby	1922	Östergötland
Motala	1881	Östergötland
Mölndal	1922	Västra Götaland
Nacka	1949	Stockholm
Nora	1643	Örebro
Norrköping	1384	Östergötland
Norrtälje	1622	Stockholm
Nybro	1932	Kalmar
Nyköping	1187	Södermanland
Nynäshamn	1946	Stockholm
Nässjö	1914	Jönköping
Oskarshamn	1856	Kalmar
Oxelösund	1950	Södermanland
Piteå	1621	Norrbotten
Ronneby	1387–1680, 1882	Blekinge
Sala	1624	Västmanland
Sandviken	1943	Gävleborg
Sigtuna	980	Stockholm
Simrishamn	1300	Skåne
Skanör	1200	Skåne
Skanör med Falsterbo	1754	Skåne
Skara	988	Västra Götaland
Skellefteå	1845	Västerbotten
Skänninge	1200	Östergötland
Skövde	1400	Västra Götaland
Sollefteå	1917	Västernorrland
Solna	1943	Stockholm
Stockholm	1250	Stockholm
Strängnäs	1336	Södermanland
Strömstad	1672	Västra Götaland
Sundbyberg	1927	Stockholm
Sundsvall	1624	Västernorrland
Säffle	1951	Värmland
Säter	1642	Dalarna
Sävsjö	1947	Jönköping
Söderhamn	1620	Gävleborg
Söderköping	1200	Östergötland
Södertälje	1000	Stockholm
Sölvesborg	1445	Blekinge
Tidaholm	1910	Västra Götaland
Torshälla	1317	Södermanland
Tranås	1919	Jönköping
Trelleborg	1200	Skåne
Trollhättan	1916	Västra Götaland
Trosa	1300	Södermanland
Uddevalla	1498	Västra Götaland
Ulricehamn	1400	Västra Götaland
Umeå	1622	Västerbotten
Uppsala	1286	Uppsala
Vadstena	1400	Östergötland
Varberg	1100	Halland
Vaxholm	1652	Stockholm
Vetlanda	1920	Jönköping
Vimmerby	1400	Kalmar
Visby	1000	Gotland
Vänersborg	1644	Västra Götaland
Värnamo	1920	Jönköping
Västervik	1200	Kalmar
Västerås	990	Västmanland
Växjö	1342	Kronoberg
Ystad	1200	Skåne
Åmål	1643	Västra Götaland
Ängelholm	1516	Skåne
Örebro	1200	Örebro
Öregrund	1491	Uppsala
Örnsköldsvik	1894	Västernorrland
Östersund	1786	Jämtland
Östhammar	1300	Uppsala

=== Notes ===
1. Skanör and Falsterbo were joined administratively in 1754 by the name Skanör med Falsterbo; they merged into a single urban area in the 1960s, still keeping their separate identities as two towns.

== Today ==
Most of the former towns are today urban centres (tätorter) and seats of their municipalities. Two seats/former towns and municipalities have a different name: Djursholm is the seat of Danderyd Municipality and Visby is the seat of Gotland Municipality.

A number of suburban towns have grown together with neighbours and are nowadays seldom considered as separate towns:

- Huskvarna (part of Jönköping)
- Mölndal (part of Gothenburg urban area)
- Djursholm, Nacka, Solna, Sundbyberg (part of Stockholm urban area)
- Lidingö (separated from Stockholm by water, but anyhow often counted to its urban area although according to Statistics Sweden, Lidingö is an urban area of its own)

The following are not seats of their municipalities:

- Gränna and Huskvarna (in Jönköping Municipality)
- Mariefred (in Strängnäs Municipality)
- Marstrand (in Kungälv Municipality)
- Sigtuna (in Sigtuna Municipality where the seat is Märsta)
- Skanör med Falsterbo (in Vellinge Municipality)
- Skänninge (in Mjölby Municipality)
- Torshälla (in Eskilstuna Municipality)
- Öregrund (in Östhammar Municipality)

== See also ==
- Stad (Sweden)
- Municipalities of Sweden
- List of urban areas in Sweden by population
- List of cities
- List of cities in Europe
