= List of towns in Scania =

The following localities in Scania, which has been one of the historical province of Sweden, were granted a charter and town privileges, mostly by the Danish king, as the province was under Danish rule up until the Treaty of Roskilde in 1658:

Town	Year of charter	Description
Lund	approximately 990	historically the religious centre of Skåne and for extended times of all of Scandinavia
Helsingborg	1085	of strategic importance at the neck of The Sound
Skanör and Falsterbo	approximately 1200	situated at the southern entrance to The Sound, of particular importance in medieval times, widely renowned for the annual herring market from which salted herring was delivered to the Hanseatic towns on the European continent. The towns were in 1754 united under the same mayor and are since that time traditionally regarded as one city, known as Skanör med Falsterbo
Ystad	approximately 1200	harbour at the Baltic Sea and traditionally the principal port to the European continent
Trelleborg	approximately 1257	harbour at the Baltic Sea of importance already in pre-historical times. In 1619 the privileges were withdrawn. It was again granted the title of stad in 1867
Malmö	approximately 1250	established as the fortified harbour of Lund, within a few centuries arguably the richest and most important town in Skåne. Today Skåne's largest and Sweden's third city. Capital of the administrative Skåne County
Simrishamn	approximately 1300	since 1617 the sole town on Skåne's eastern shore, principal port to the large island of Bornholm
Landskrona	1413	good natural harbour between Malmö and Helsingborg, considered as the best site for a regional capital
Kristianstad	1622	erected as a castle against the threatening Swedes, the last town to be chartered before the decline that followed the cession to Sweden
Åhus	Circa 1200	Located at the mouth of Helge å where the archbishopric had built a castle at the harbour on Skåne's eastern shore. The town suffered from the Danish reformation (in 1536) and even more from plunderings during extended Swedish–Danish wars of the 15th–17th centuries. The town was moved (or the privileges were) to Kristianstad in 1617.
Ängelholm	1516–1547	Ängelholm was of strategic importance at the North-Western entrance to Skåne, at a bridge over Rönne å. Ängelholm was granted full town-privileges again in 1767, but remained insignificant for long. In the early 19th century, its population was less than 500.

The local government reform of 1863 created the concept of municipalities in Sweden. The localities with town privileges were instituted as municipalities with the title of stad (city/town). In the province of Skåne they were: Ängelholm, Helsingborg, Kristianstad, Landskrona, Lund, Malmö, Simrishamn, Skanör med Falsterbo and Ystad. Trelleborg which had lost its privileges in 1619 got the title in 1867.

During the 20th century these localities were instituted as städer:

Town	Year of charter	Description
Hässleholm	1914	Gradually developed from 1860 in connection with the construction of the main Stockholm to Malmö railway line.
Eslöv	1911	Started expanding during the 1860s as railways were built and Eslöv became a junction with lines in six different directions.
Höganäs	1936	In the 19th century industries were built in Höganäs using clay for making ceramic products.

After 1951 no more städer were instituted and the local government reform of 1971 saw the abolishment of the term, replacing it with kommun for all municipalities, regardless of former status.

Today there is no official definition, but in some contexts (such as Sveriges Nationalatlas) localities with over 10,000 inhabitants are regarded as cities.

== Urban areas in order of size ==
Below is a list of localities in Skåne County with a population greater than 10,000 as of 2005.

1. Malmö, 258,020 (Malmö Municipality and Burlöv Municipality)
2. Helsingborg, 91,457
3. Lund, 76,188
4. Kristianstad, 33,083
5. Landskrona, 28,670
6. Trelleborg, 25,643
7. Ängelholm, 22,532
8. Hässleholm, 17,730
9. Ystad, 17,286
10. Eslöv, 16,551
11. Staffanstorp, 13,783
12. Höganäs, 13,401
13. Höllviken, 10.014 (Vellinge Municipality)

== See also ==
- Stad (Sweden)
- Municipalities of Sweden
- Urban areas in Sweden
