= Skanör Church =

Lutheran church in Skåne, Sweden

Coordinates: 55°25′11″N 12°50′59″E

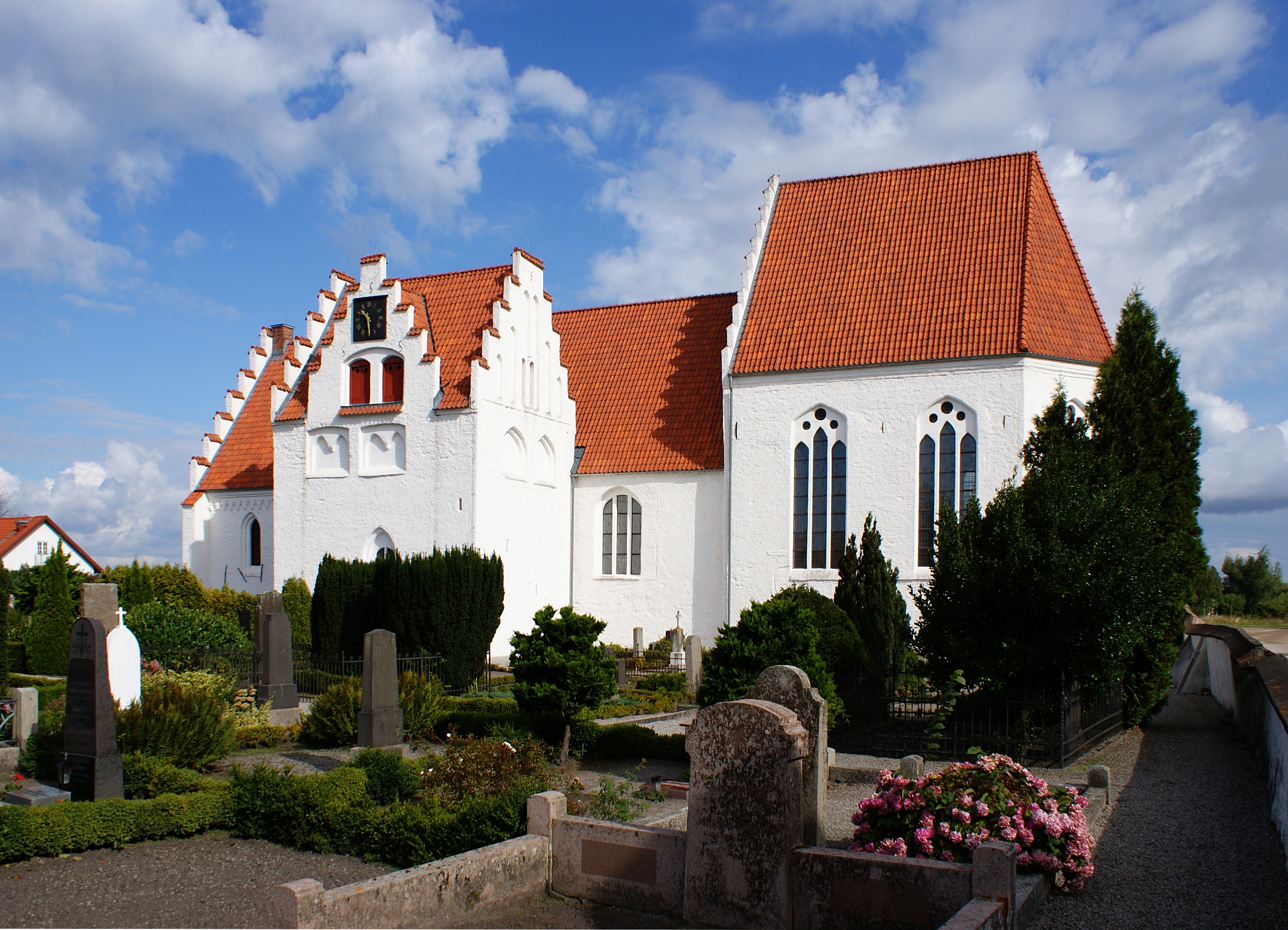
Skanör church

Skanör Church (Swedish: Skanörs kyrka, also known as the Church of St. Olof, Swedish: S:t Olofs kyrka) is a medieval Lutheran church at Skanör in Vellinge Municipality, Skåne County, Sweden. It is associated with the Skanör-Falsterbo parish (Skanör-Falsterbo församling) in the Diocese of Lund within the Church of Sweden.

== History and architecture ==
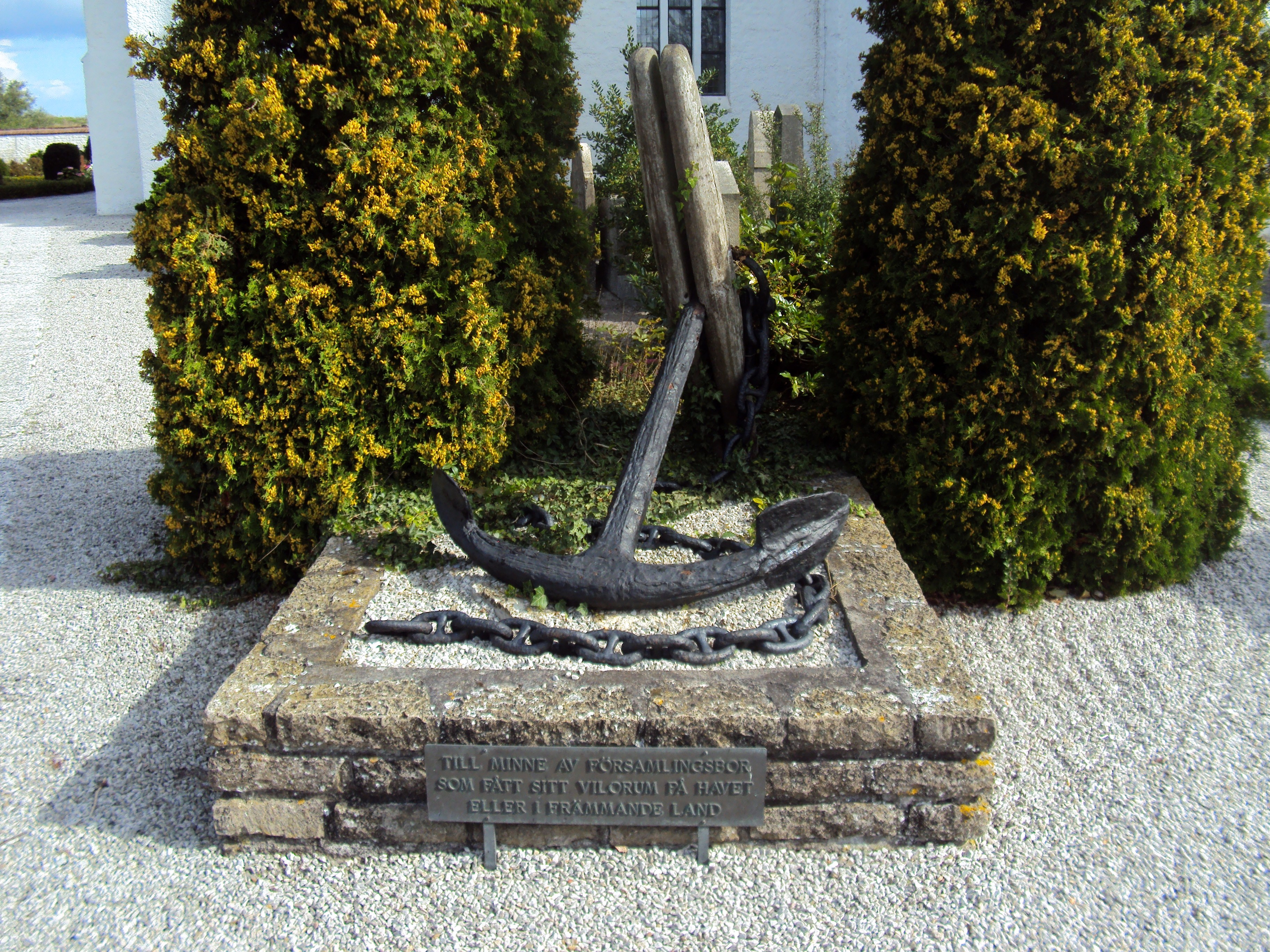
Memorial to parishioners who were lost at sea

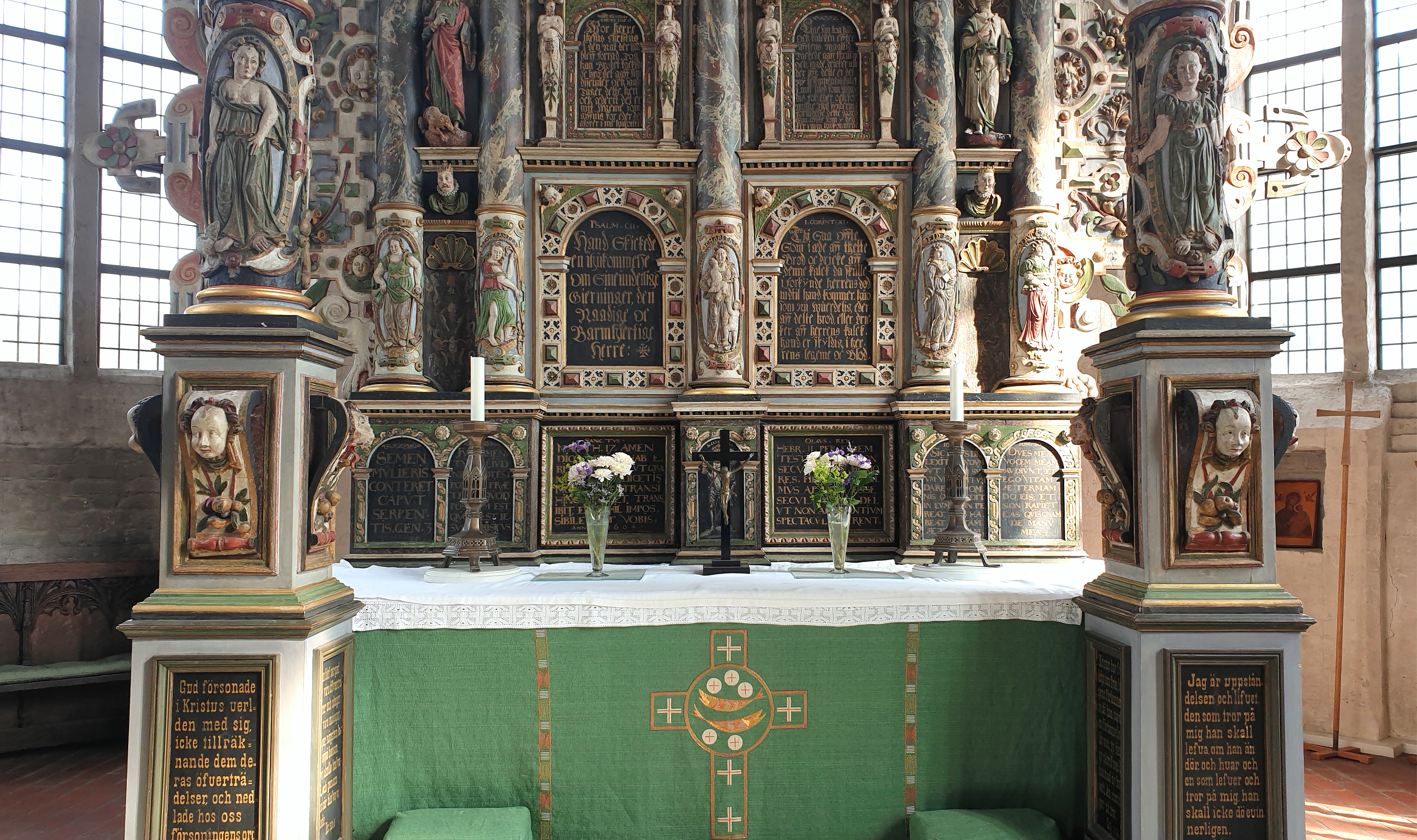
The altar

There has probably been a church at the site of the present one since the 12th century. The oldest parts of the present church date from the first half of the 13th century. The Romanesque nave is the oldest part of the church. It was unusual in that it was from the outset equipped with vaulted ceiling, not a simpler flat wooden ceiling.

Rich herring deposits on the north side of the Falsterbo peninsula made Skanör an important trading center in the 12th to 16th century. By the 14th century, Skanör and neighbouring Falsterbo (Skanör med Falsterbo) grew rich on herring-trade and through the regionally important Scania Market (Skänemarkedet) which took place annually.

This had repercussions for the church, which was greatly expanded. The nave was doubled in size, the present bell tower added, and the western façade adorned, typically for Scanian medieval churches, with crow-stepped gables. These additions were made in the new Gothic style. Less than a hundred years later, the large choir which today dominates the church with its high Gothic windows, was added. Furthermore, under the choir a crypt was built; Skanör church is one of only four medieval churches in Scania with a crypt. These reconstruction efforts were probably intended only as the beginning of even larger reconstruction works, but these never came about (possibly as an effect of the herring trade shifting focus to nearby Falsterbo).

There are some noteworthy interior details of the church. The main altar is a large Renaissance altar, probably made in Malmö. The baptismal font is medieval, although scholars disagree on its exact age. The triumphal cross is medieval, as is one of the church bells, made by a master bell-maker Gherhard Crammar in Lübeck.

== See also ==
- Falsterbo Church
