= Stora Hammar Old Church =

- Stora Hammars gamla kyrka
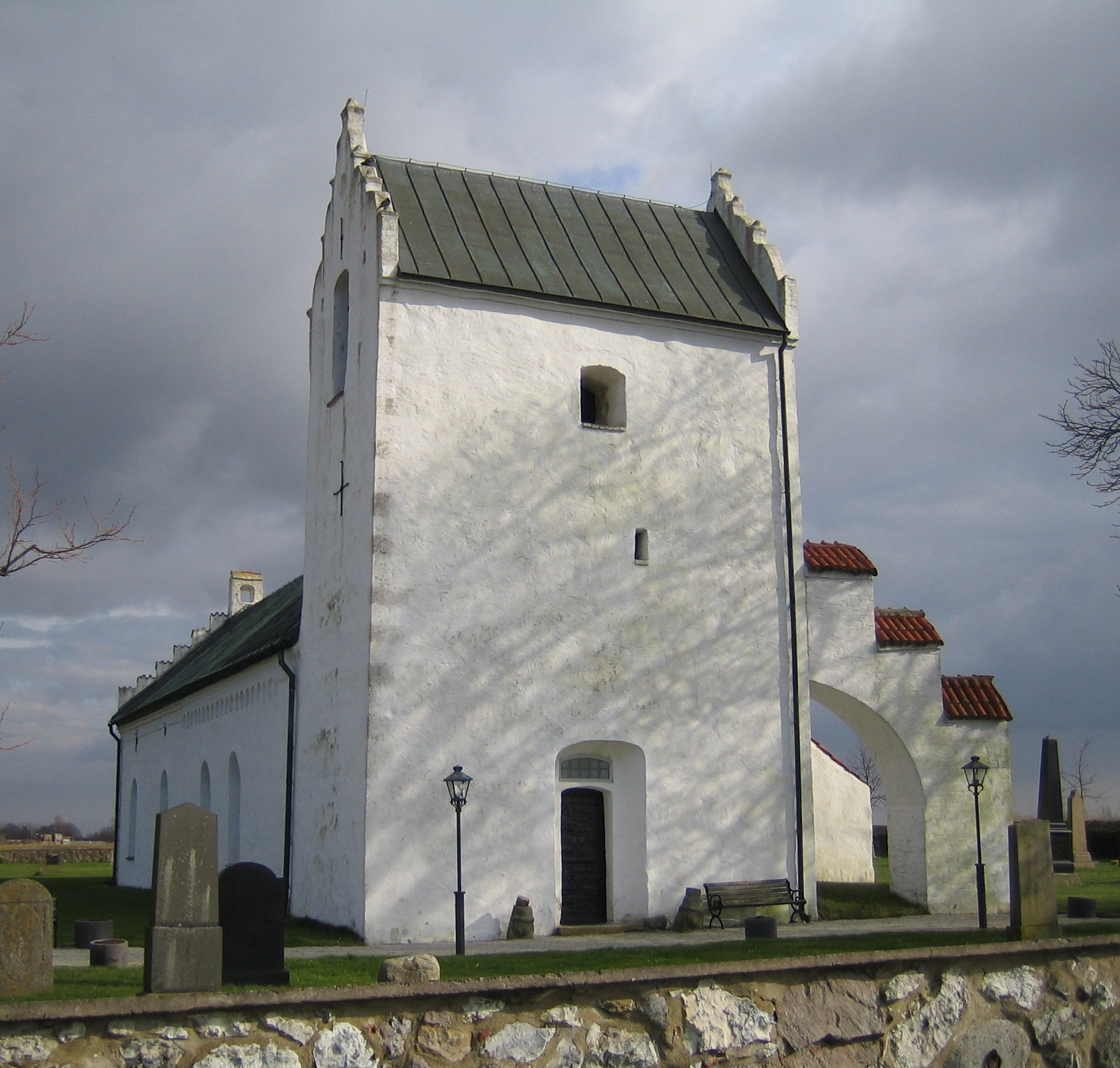
- Stora Hammar Old Church

- 55°25′24″N 12°59′24″E
- Country: Sweden
- Denomination: Church of Sweden

Stora Hammar Old Church (Swedish: Stora Hammars gamla kyrka) is a medieval Lutheran church in south-western Scania, Sweden. It belongs to the Diocese of Lund.

== History ==
The presently visible stone church is the oldest in the area of Skanör med Falsterbo, dating in its oldest parts from the middle of the 12th century. Before the stone church was built, an even older but now vanished stave church stood on the same spot. The church was built by the so-called Oxie Master, who is known to have worked on several churches in the region. Another stonemason who is mentioned in connection to the church is the so-called Mårten stenmästare (Martin Stonemaster), who worked on the construction site of Lund Cathedral. The stone church was built in the then prevailing Romanesque style, and consisted of a nave, choir and a semi-circular apse.

The church was enlarged at the end of the Middle Ages. The old choir was dismantled and a new one built, without an apse. The original chancel arch between the choir and the nave was also removed. The church ceiling was also replaced with vaults at the end of the Middle Ages; above these remains of Romanesque murals still exist. The tower was also erected at the end of the Middle Ages.

In 1804, the present western entrance was created. Before, two separate entrances had existed: the northern one was for women and the southern one for men.

A new church was built for the congregation in 1902, Stora Hammar New Church. After its inauguration, the old church was scheduled for demolition, but its walls proved to be too sturdy and it was simply left to decay. In the 1920s Dr. Johan af Klercker started to plan for its preservation and collected money for the purpose. af Klercker, who worked at the Swedish National Heritage Board, had family connections to the church: his mother's family came from the area and several of his ancestors had been priests in the old church. He collected money among his relatives and eventually managed to raise enough to renovate the church. It was re-inaugurated in 1929. The church was renovated again in 1964-65.

== Architecture ==
The church is a well-preserved Romanesque church, built of fieldstone. It contains sculpted Romanesque reliefs and a baptismal font made by either the Oxie Master of Martin Stonemaster. It is decorated with murals from the 15th century, made by a Danish artist. The paintings depict scenes from the Creation and the Passion of Christ. The church also has an original medieval entrance door, made of wood and reinforced with iron. Its handle is in the shape of an iron ring held by an iron hand. The church also contain some notable post-Reformation furnishings. The altarpiece and the pulpit are both the works of Johan Ullberg, a local artist of some renown active during the 18th century. The altarpiece and pulpit are both dated to 1755. The pews are from the 17th century and the organ was built 1825-26.
