= Rosenius =

Rosenius is a Swedish surname. Notable people with the surname include:

- Bengt Rosenius (1918–1979), Swedish Air Force major general
- Carl Olof Rosenius (1816–1868), Swedish preacher, author and editor
- Frank Rosenius (born 1940), Swedish Navy vice admiral
- Nils Rosenius, Swedish figure skater
- Paul Rosenius (1865–1957), Swedish physician and naturalist
