= Falsterbo Lighthouse =

Falsterbo Lighthouse Falsterbo Udde
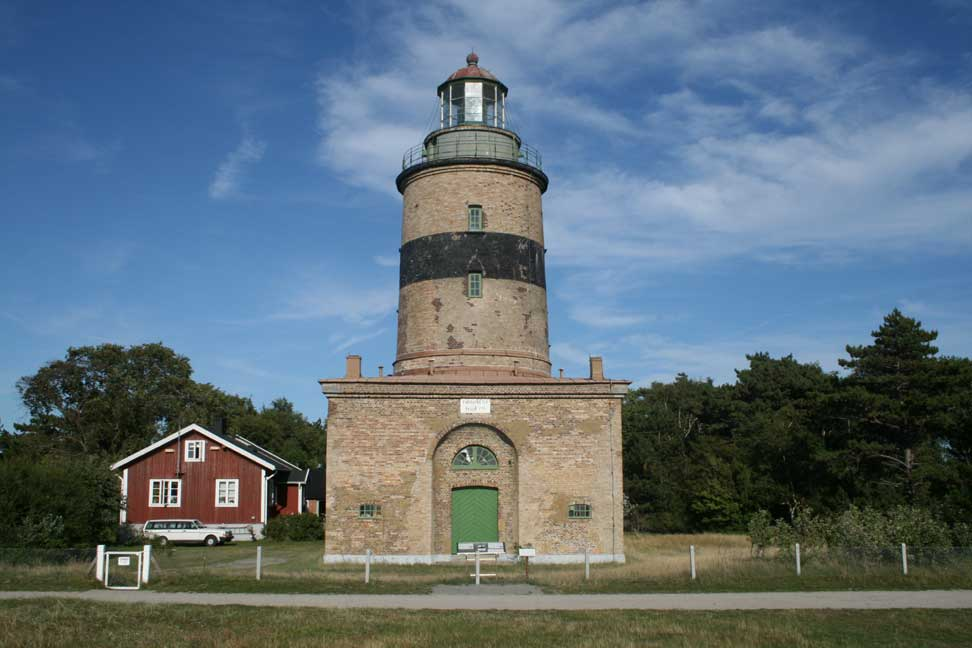
- Falsterbo Lighthouse
- Location: Falsterbo; Skåne; Sweden
- Coordinates: 55.383796°N 12.816399°E

Tower
- Constructed: 1796
- Construction: brick tower
- Automated: 1972
- Height: 25 m (82 ft)
- Shape: cylindrical tower on a 2-storey building with balcony and lantern
- Markings: unpainted tower with black band, red lantern roof
- Power source: bituminous coal, rapeseed oil, kerosene, acetylene, electricity
- Operator: Sjofartsverket
- Heritage: individual listed building complex, enskilt byggnadsminne

Light
- Deactivated: 1990-1993
- Focal height: 24 m (79 ft)
- Lens: Second order Fresnel
- Intensity: 4,000 cd
- Range: 10 nmi (19 km; 12 mi)
- Characteristic: Oc W 5s.
- Sweden no.: SV-6648

Falsterbo Lighthouse (Swedish: Falsterbo fyr) . To the north-east of the lighthouse is the city of Skanör-Falsterbo, to the south-east of the lighthouse are some of the finest sandy beaches in Sweden and surrounding the lighthouse is the golf course of the Falsterbo Golf Club.

== History ==
The sea route past the Falsterbo Headland has always been dangerous, because of the moving sand banks hidden under the sea. In 1230 the Dominikans from Lübeck sent a letter to the Danish king Valdemar with a request that a "mark" should be built to warn seafarers. There is no evidence that it was ever built. Most likely is that a prominent house at Falsterbo and The Church of Santa Maria were used as seamarks.

In 1636, a lever light known as a "swape" light was built nearby at Kolabacken. An iron basket full of burning coal was hoisted up and down by a balanced bar, hence the light was moving and easier to detect. The coal fire was intensely red and could not be mistaken for a star or ship lantern. The remains of the beacon are still visible as a small hillock of ashes and coal, "Coal Hill" (Swedish: Kolabacken). Towards the end of the 18th century the lever light was moved to the site of the present lighthouse, closer to the new shoreline.

The lighthouse was built in 1793-96 and the "light" was a coal fire at the top. In 1842-43 the uppermost crenellated parts were replaced with the present lantern. Coal was replaced with rapeseed oil. The oil was very inflammable and the lighthouse keepers had to watch the lamp all night. To make a periodic light; a screen was moved around the lantern by heavy weights. Around 1850 a house for the keeper was built next to the lighthouse. At the end of the 19th century another house was built for the assistants to the lighthouse keeper.

Also when the oil was replaced with paraffin and, later gas, the screen still had to be moved around. When electric light was installed in 1935 the screen was removed and so were most of the staff. Only one lighthouse keeper remained. In 1972 the lighthouse was automated and the last keeper retired.

The lighthouse is 25 metres (82 ft) high and 12 metres (39 ft) broad. Nowadays it has no importance as a navigation mark and therefore the light is not very strong (ca. 4000 candela). It was totally turned off 1990–93. The interval of the light is intermittent: 4 seconds on, 1 second off, repeated.

== Present activities ==
Even though the lighthouse is managing itself nowadays, there are still many activities around it. Falsterbo is one of twenty synoptic weather stations in Sweden still staffed. Every three hours weather data (wind, temperature, air pressure, visibility, cloud cover etc.) are reported to the Swedish Meteorological and Hydrological Institute. In earlier days the weather observations were carried out by the lighthouse keepers.

The lighthouse garden is the ringing site of the Falsterbo Bird Observatory. Falsterbo is a premier site in Europe to watch autumn bird migration. Several millions of birds pass every autumn en route to wintering areas in Africa or southern Europe. Annually, about 25,000 small birds are trapped and ringed.

Every year on the last Sunday of August it is "Lighthouse Day". Then the lighthouse is open to the public. Visitors are shown not only the lighthouse itself but also bird ringing and the weather station.
