= Falsterbo Church =

- Falsterbo kyrka
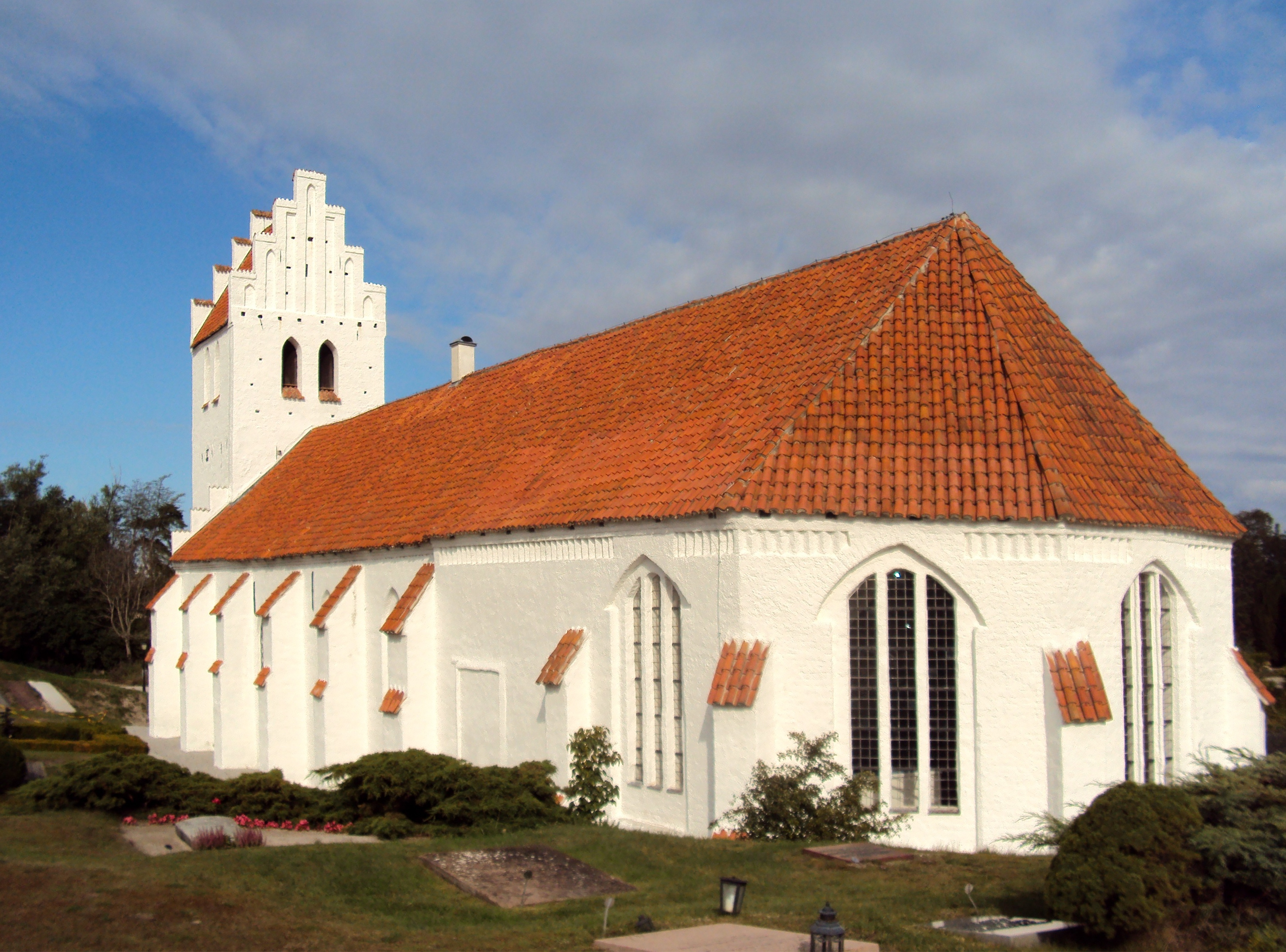
- Falsterbo Church

- Location within Skåne Location within Sweden
- 55°23′22″N 12°50′17″E
- Country: Sweden
- Denomination: Church of Sweden

Falsterbo Church (Swedish: Falsterbo kyrka, also Falsterbo St. Gertrud church Swedish: Falsterbo St. Gertrud kyrka) is a medieval Lutheran church at Falsterbo in Skåne County, Sweden.

== History and architecture ==
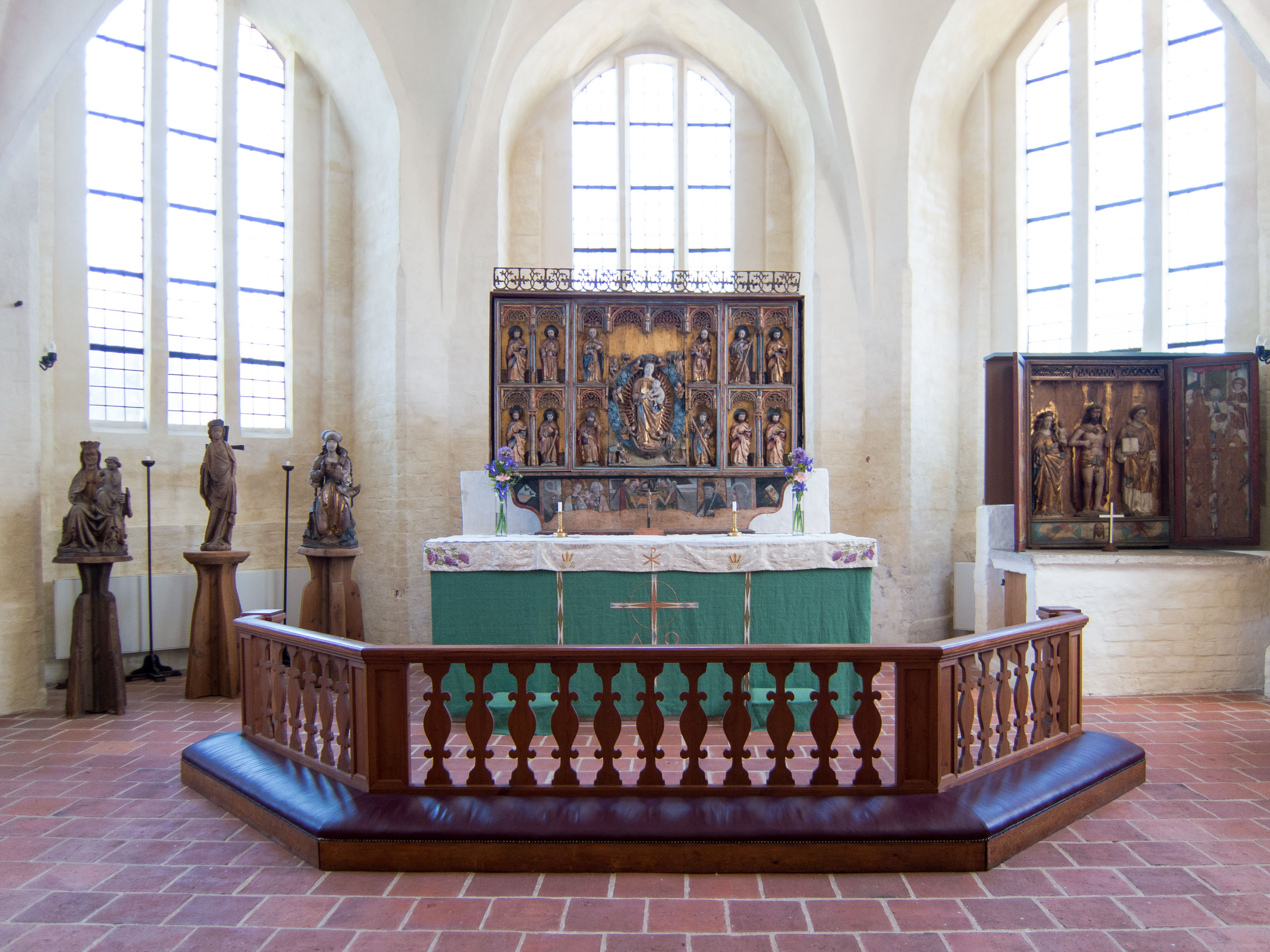
The choir of Falsterbo Church

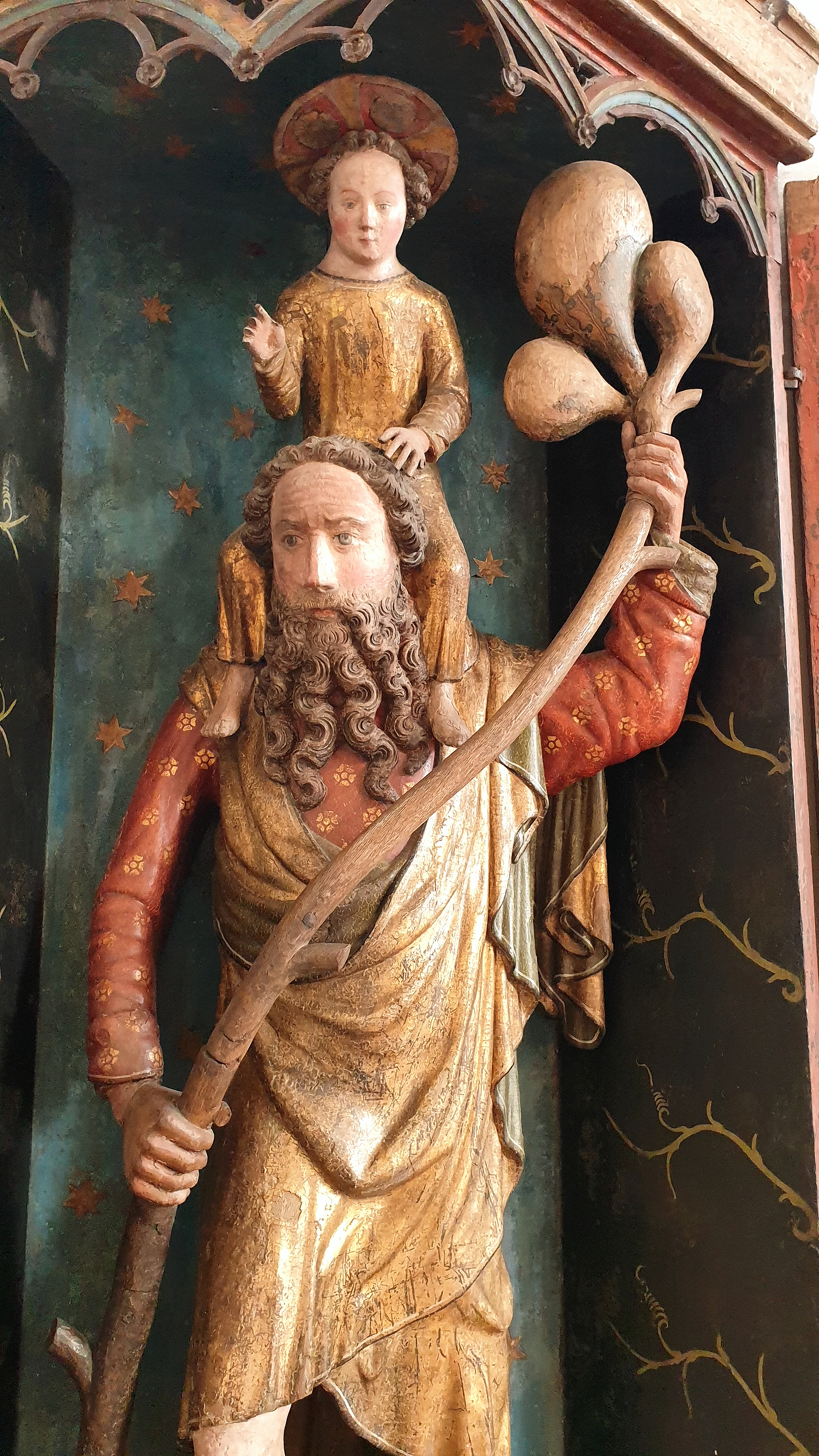
Saint Christopher, patron saint of seafarers. Detail, c. 1390.

The oldest part of the church dates from the second half of the 14th century. Construction of the relatively large church must be seen in connection with the economically important medieval herring-trade and the Scania Market (Skånemarkedet), in which Falsterbo and neighboring Skanör played a central role. The earliest church was a simple, undecorated brick building. The nave is the oldest part of the church. The present choir was added during the 15th century and at about the same time the presently visible vaulting was constructed. The tower, with its crow-stepped gables typical for medieval Danish churches (Scania only became Swedish in 1658), is probably also from the 15th century. A number of murals which have been uncovered from 1953 onwards were probably also painted over during the reconstruction of the church during this time.

The church contains some noteworthy interior details. The sculpted baptismal font is the earliest piece in the church, dating from the 14th century. The main altar is from the second half of the 15th century and probably made by Hermen Rode of Lübeck, or in his atelier. A smaller side-altar is from the same time period and likewise from northern Germany. There is also a sculpture depicting Saint Christopher made circa 1390, and attributed to Master Bertram of Minden. Two free-standing medieval Madonnas, one reputedly of French origin, can also be mentioned, as can a sculpture depicting a kneeling princess - the only remnant of a Saint George and the Dragon group, supposedly by master carver Henning Roleve of Rostock, another northern German late Gothic sculptor.

== See also ==
- Skanör Church
