= Måkläppen =

Nature reserve in Skåne, Sweden

Måkläppen Nature Reserve
- IUCN category III (natural monument or feature)
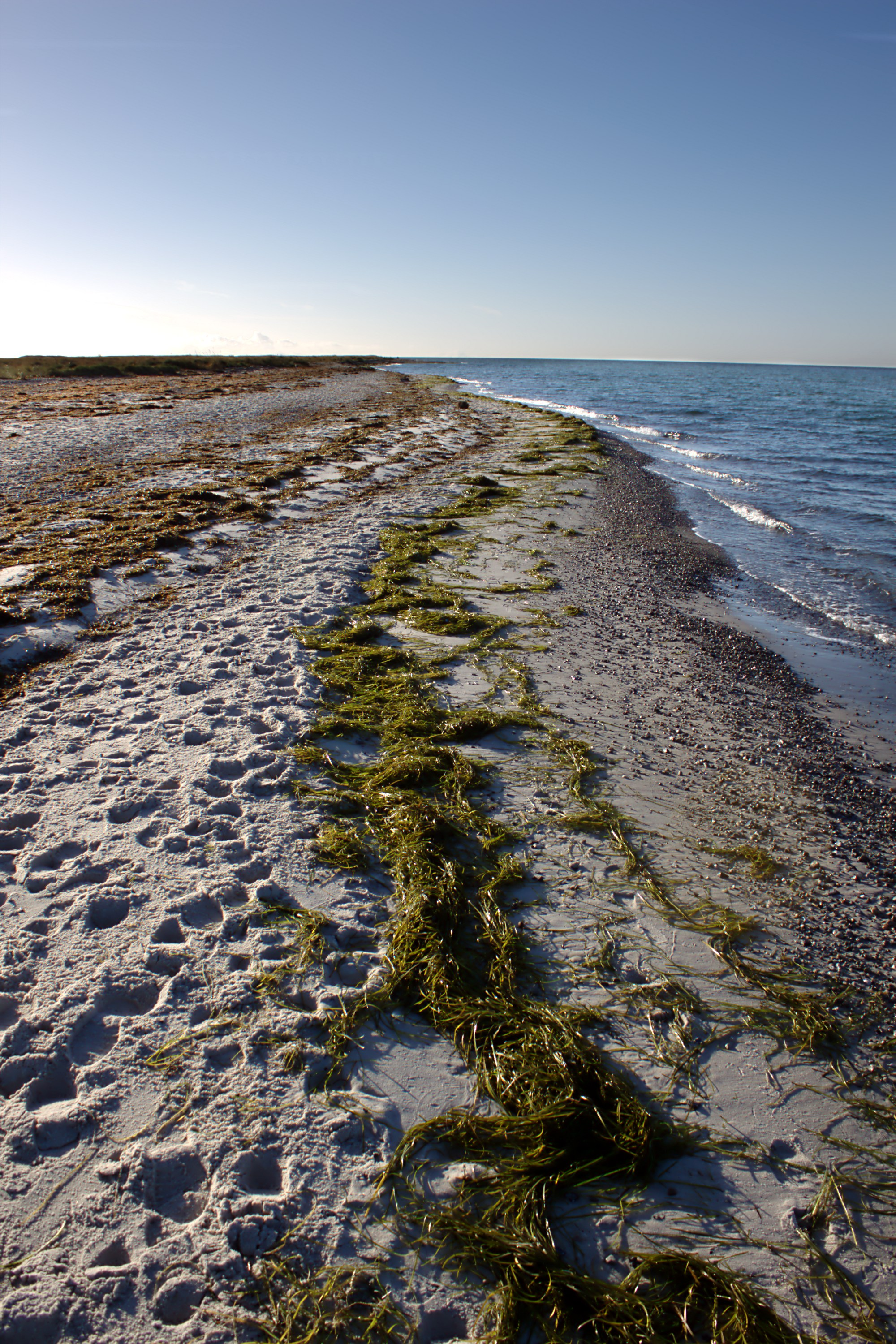

- Location within Sweden
- Location: Vellinge Municipality, Skåne County
- Nearest city: Falsterbo
- Coordinates: 55°21′52″N 12°48′15″E
- Established: 1899

Måkläppen is a nature reserve that protrudes from the Falsterbo peninsula in southwestern Sweden. It was created by sandbanks built on top of a moraine core. The Måkläppen nature reserve and nature conservation association was formed in 1899 through the efforts of conservationists including Paul Rosenius. The appearance of Måkläppen changes as sand builds up and is taken away by wind, ocean currents, storm surges and high tides. These processes, in addition to abrasion and beach erosion, removes the sand previously sent there.

Many kinds of waterfowl nest at Måkläppen, and it is an important site for harbor and grey seals. Because of the area's natural importance, no access is allowed from February to the end of October.

Depending on how currents change, one might encounter small to large remnants of wooden ships up to several hundred years old when walking along the sandbar.

In the Middle Ages it is believed some temporary settlements may have existed on the island.
