= Paul Rosenius =

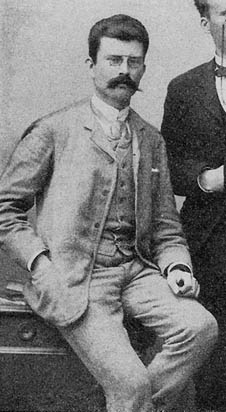
Rosenius c. 1900

Johan Anders Martin Paul Rosenius (12 March 1865 – 5 July 1957) was a Swedish physician, ornithologist, artist and writer. He was a pioneer bird photographer and conservationist. A major work by him was a six-volume book on the birds of Sweden and their nests with photographs and illustrations.

== Life and work ==
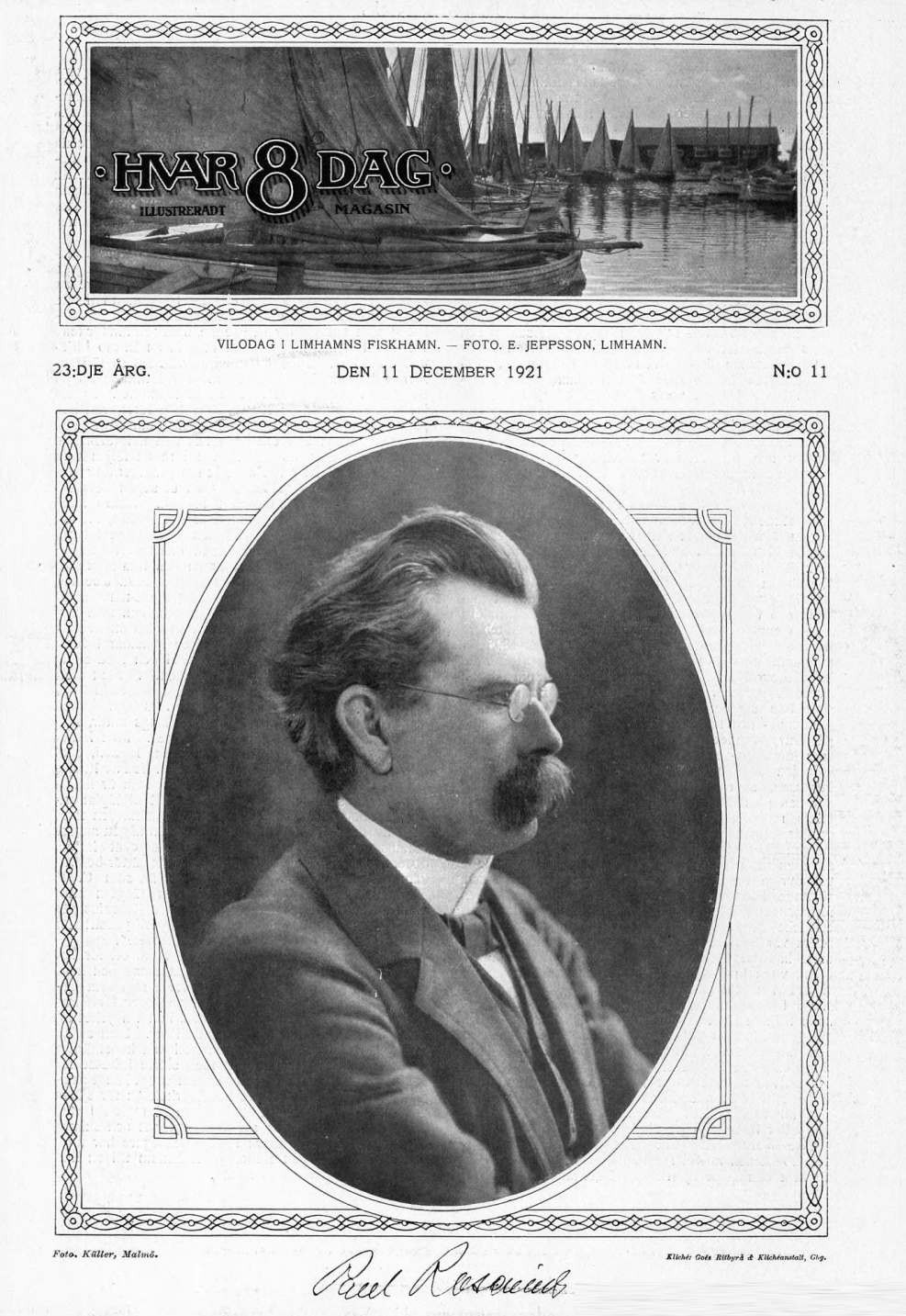
On the cover of Hvar 8 Dag in 1921

Rosenius was born in Gothenburg to theology professor Martin Gabriel and Martina Henrietta Wennerberg. The preacher Carl Olof Rosenius was an uncle. After matriculating from the Lund cathedral school in 1883 he went to Lund University receiving a bachelors degree in philosophy in 1887. He then switched to medicine at the Karolinska Institute and received a degree in 1891. He studied gastrointestinal diseases at the Sahlgrenska hospital in Gothenburg and worked with Dr J. Boas in Berlin and made a trip to Vienna before moving to Malmö to practice privately from 1895. As a student he was influenced by Bengt Lidforss and Axel Danielsson. Their circle of radical thinkers known as the De unge gubbarne or DUG held debates including a prominent one on ethics from an evolutionary perspective, in which Lidforss took part on March 9, 1888. Rosenius travelled widely, became a pioneer bird photographer and was involved in nature conservation through his writings and art. Rosenius collected bird eggs in his early years and was involved in the formation of Kullaberg bird preserve. He was also involved in the establishment of Måkläppen in 1899. He also took part in religious debates and was opposed to orthodox Christianity. He published Naturstycken, a collection of essays on birds and nature illustrated by Bruno Liljefors, in 1897. He was a friend of Victor Hasselblad from whom he acquired a camera and began to photograph birds and in 1919 he published a book (Min jakt med kamera ="My Hunt with the Camera"). His largest work was a six-volume work on the birds of Sweden and their nests (Sveriges fåglar och fågelbon) which were first published in a series of papers from 1913 but published in a bound series from 1926 to 1949 with last two parts published posthumously. It consisted of 2400 text pages, 950 photographs and colored plates. The prose was in an idiosyncratic style that drew criticism from some ornithologists. The birds were described in life in human and divine terms. It has been interpreted as an animist theology (or "ornitheology") where the birds reveal themselves as non-human gods. In 1912, he declared himself as a "pagan", declared theological discussions as pointless and claimed that one merely had to walk in the countryside to be united with paganism (hedendomen).

Rosenius married Nanna Alfhild Pyk in 1896. They had a son Bengt and a daughter Karin, who married George Felix Allen Skelton (1909-1985), an English RAF pilot whose Defiant was shot over the Netherlands in 1940. Skelton had been held prisoner in Germany during World War II and Rosenius was able to influence his extradition in 1943 in exchange for a bound set of his volumes on Swedish birds and their nests sent to Hermann Göring.
