= Scania market =

Medieval fish market in Sweden

The Scania market (Note: Danish Skånemarkedet, Swedish Skånemarknaden) was a major fish market for herring which took place annually in Scania during the Middle Ages. From around 1200, it became one of the most important events for trade around the Baltic Sea and made Scania into a major distribution center for West-European goods bound for eastern Scandinavia. The Scania Market continued to be an important trade center for 250 years and was a cornerstone of the Hanseatic League's wealth.

The fair took place from August 24 to October 9, mainly in locations between the two Scanian towns of Skanör and Falsterbo at the southern mouth of Öresund, with much of the connected industry spread out on the surrounding peninsula, but Køge, Dragør, Copenhagen, Malmö, Helsingborg, Simrishamn, Ystad, and Trelleborg were also part of the Scania Market. Since the fishermen erected their trading booths and temporary shops close to the area where the herring was spawning, the exact locations of the Scania Market changed from year to year.

== Herring trade and salt import ==
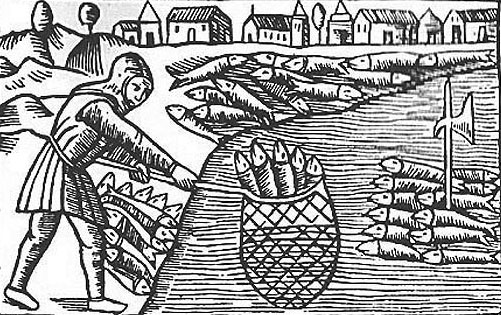
Medieval herring fishing in Scania (published 1555).

The basis for the market's popularity was the rich herring fishing around the Falsterbo Peninsula. Legend tells that the herring fishery off the Scanian coast was so rich, that one could scoop up the fish with one's hands. After a visit to the region in 1364, the French crusader Philippe de Mezieres wrote: "Two months a year, that is in September and October, the herring travel from one sea to the other through the Sound, by order of God, in such large numbers that it is a great wonder, and so many pass through the sound in these months, that at several places one can cut them with a dagger." Mezieres further went on to estimate that no less than 300,000 people were active in the trade during these months.

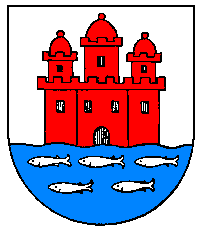
The herring trade is symbolized in the Skanör-Falsterbo City Arms.

As early as the 12th century the peninsula had become a centre for the herring trade; the Scanian name for the town Falsterbo was Falsterbothe, which meant "the booths for fish from Falster". The 13th-century German chronicler Arnold of Lübeck, author of Chronicon Slavorum, wrote that the Danes had wealth and an abundance of everything thanks to the yearly catches of herring at the Scanian coast. The laws of the city of Leiden in the 15th century stated that all herring sellers selling herring other than from Scania, should warn their customers with a clear marking.

The demand for herring during this period was great; it was a fairly inexpensive source of protein for the populations around the Baltic during the winter and the Catholic Church demanded fasting (from meat), in Christ's following, in connection with Lent. Due to the large production and the great demand, the Scania Market became the most important North European market in the 14th century.

During the fishing season, the necessary salt and barrels for conservation came from Hanseatic Lüneburg and were provided by Hanseatic traders mainly from Lübeck. Lübeck also, to some extent, provided the Scanians with an additional work force, so called "gill-women" who cleaned the fish, ensuring a swift salting of the landed fish.

== Danish taxation ==
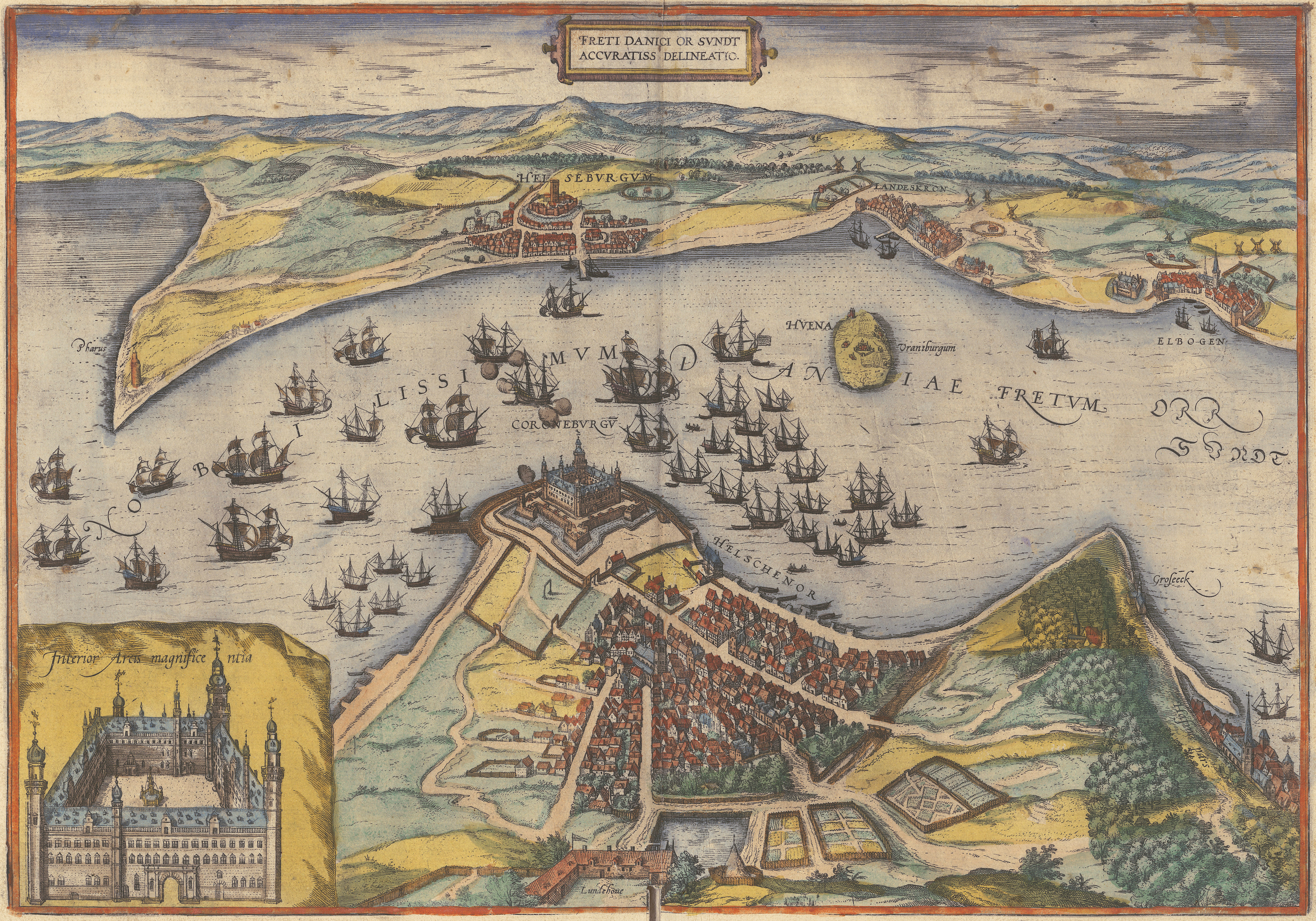
The Danish castles of Helsingborg (top)and Helsingør (bottom) at the narrowest part of Öresund (depicted in the 1500s).

The fishing trade was closely regulated by the Danish crown, with special rules regarding issues such as the fishing nets' mesh size, enforced by special bailiffs who policed the trade. Royal governors were installed in castles at Skanør and Falsterbo to collect customs and act as judicial and administrative leaders.

Apart from the fishermen and the local fish traders, merchants from Lübeck and other Hanseatic towns, as well as from England, Scotland, Flanders, and Normandy, came to the herring market to buy and sell herring, but also to trade in other goods with the Scandinavian merchants, landowners and peasants. Traders arrived from Denmark, eastern Norway and Sweden, as well as the rest of the Baltic. A wide variety of goods were traded, among them horses, butter, iron, tar, grain, and handicraft products from the North, Prussia, and Livonia.

The fishing and the Scania Market yielded a large income to the Danish Crown, and made together with the Sound Toll the state virtually independent of tax incomes for extended periods of time. A good fishing year in the 14th century could mean an export of 300,000 barrels of herring; and it is estimated that one third of the Danish king's income came from the Scania Market. Despite declining catches and revenue through the 1400s, proceeds from the market and Sound Toll funded the nascent Danish naval fleet, beginning with the carvel ship known as Gribshunden in 1485.

== Strife between Denmark and the Hanseatic League ==
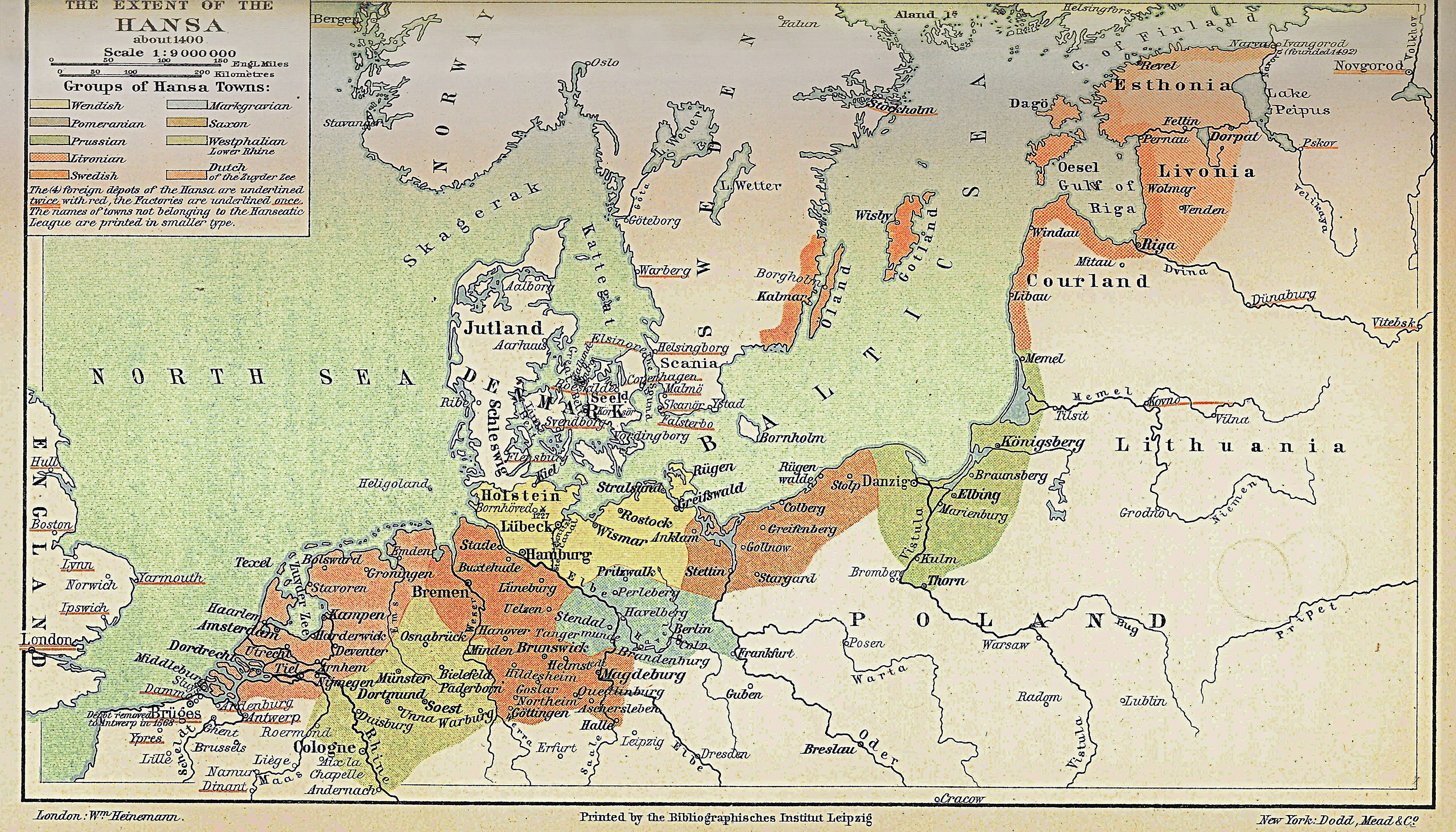
The Extent of the Hansa about 1400.

Most of the 14th century was characterized by strife and wars between Danish kings and the Hansa. According to a German view, the Danes got herring "for nothing from God"—only to sell it dearly. As opposed to Stockholm and Bergen, which had Scandinavia's largest Hanseatic colonies, the Danish towns of the Scania Market did not encourage large permanent settlements of Hansa merchants; most of the merchants arrived in the summer and went back home after the end of the market.

In 1367, the Hansa towns allied themselves with Sweden, Mecklenburg, and Holstein, and the Confederation of Cologne went to war against Denmark and Norway. The Danish-Hanseatic War resulted in a Hanseatic victory. With the Treaty of Stralsund in 1370, a peace was settled that left the Hanseatic League in control of the fortifications at the Scania Market and along the rest of Öresund for 15 years.

The abundance of herring around Scania abruptly ceased in the beginning of the 15th century and the region lost its importance as a trading place.

== See also ==
- History of Scania
- Old Salt Route
