= Skanör =

Town in Scania, Sweden

Coordinates: 55°25′N 12°51′E

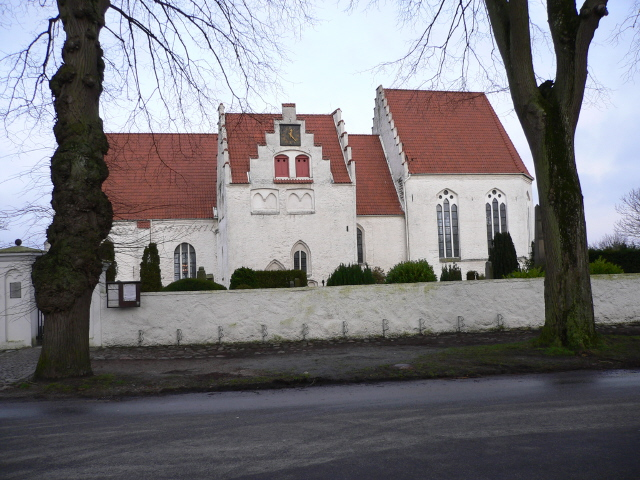
The romanesque church in Skanör

Skanör is a town in Vellinge Municipality and part of the conurbation Skanör med Falsterbo in southwestern Scania, Sweden. City facilities include hotels, restaurants, a harbour, a medieval church and an elementary school. A greenbelt called Skanörs vångar will be a new residential area in Skanör.

== The Harbours ==
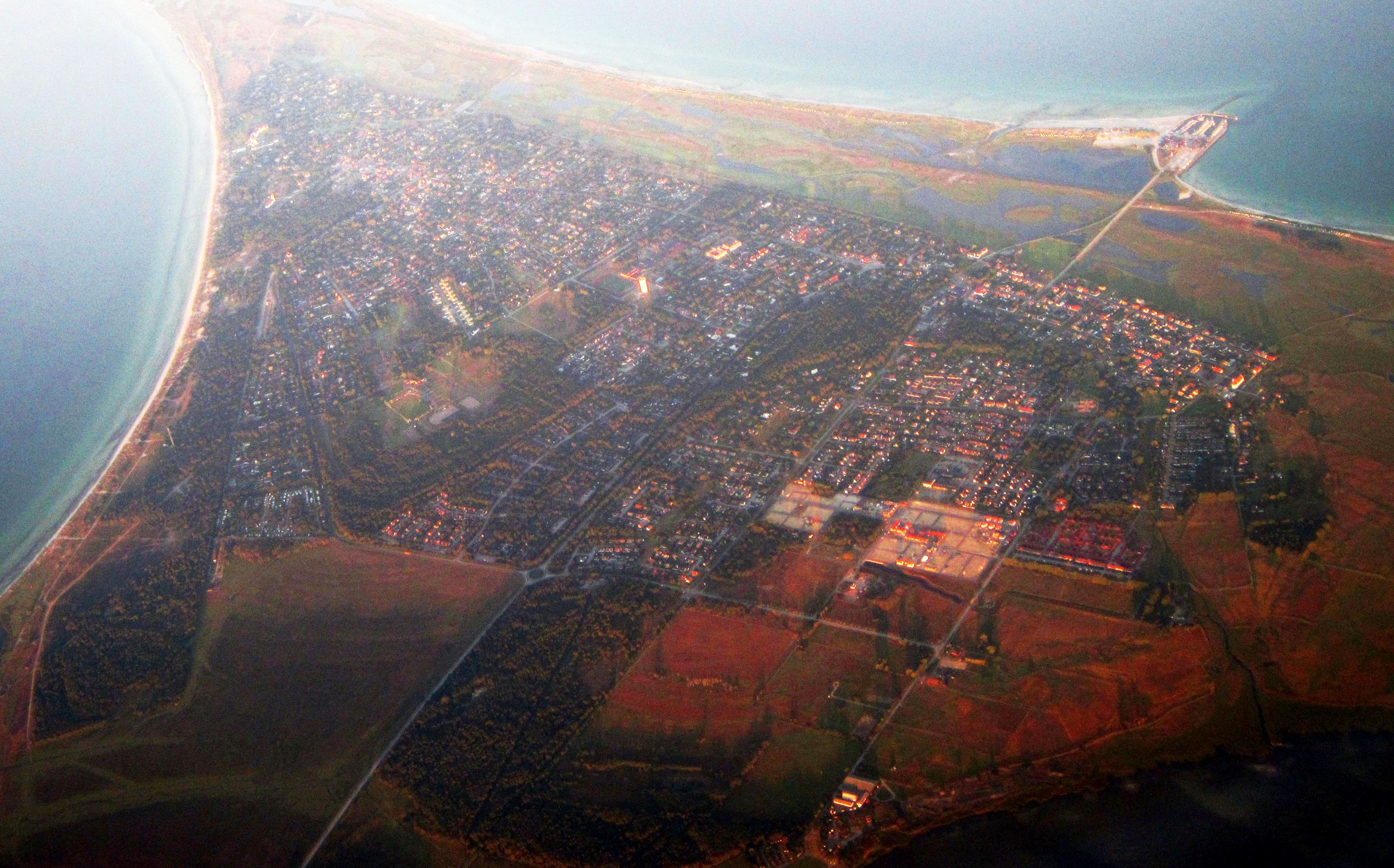
Aerial view, with Falsterbo in top-left

The Harbour of Skanör is big. It is a fishing and guest harbour. In the summer, there is a market called Sillamarknaden with a funfair and a beer tent and live bands.

"Jollebryggan", situated on the north part of the harbour, is a bridge deck which both old and young residents use for casual swimming. The older residents can be observed early mornings from late April to early October at "Jollebryggan", the younger residents usually use the bridge deck for night swimming.

There is also a small fishing harbour on the east coast of Skanör in Höllviken. The harbour consists mainly of small red fishing huts and a small ramp into the ocean. This harbour is completely natural and has no manmade features except for the aforementioned fishing huts. This harbour has no restaurants but it does have a toilet and a small raft with a picnic table on it out at sea.

For many years the restaurant and night club "Badhytten", situated in the harbour, was Skanör's most popular entertainment establishment. "Badhytten" attracted local residents as well as exotic celebrity guests and made Skanör the St. Tropez of Sweden. Celebrities such as Zlatan Ibrahimović and Mona Seilitz were known to frequent "Badhytten" on their rare trips home to Sweden. However, "Badhytten" burned down in January 2009, just before major renovations were to be carried out. The restaurant was rebuilt in the summer of 2016 in almost the same location. The difference being that the restaurant now lies partially inside the sand dunes

== Gåsaloppet ==
The Gåsaloppet (Goose Race) is traditionally celebrated every midsummer at noon. Residents team up by sixes to run through the streets of old Skanör. The team is all connected through a shared set of "skis". During the 13th century, people had goose races through the streets of Skanör to celebrate midsummer.

== Möllevallen ==
Skanörs IP (Idrottsplats) Möllevallen is the home pitch of SFIF, Skanör Falsterbo Idrottsförening.

== Möllan ==
Möllan is an ancient windmill on the outskirts of Skanör, situated at the beginning of the road to the harbour of Skanör. The origins of Möllan can be traced back to the 12th century AD. At this time, Skanör was Northern Europe's largest trading harbour for herring. At the annual herring market, up to 70,000 people gathered in Skanör to buy and sell herring. Möllan was built on order of the Danish king to simplify the grinding of herring bones. Ground herring bones, known as "Sillamjöl", was a common ingredient in the medicine of the time and also a popular aphrodisiac.

At the end of the 15th century the herring in the waters outside Skanör mysteriously disappeared. This was the beginning of the end for Skanör as a major trading and fishing port. However, the residents of Skanör quickly found other uses for the windmill. At about the same time as the herring disappeared, Skanör's town square (see reference to "Göranssons") became a central trade location for the farmers of Scania, or Skåne as it was then called. Möllan was thereafter used for hundreds of years to ground wheat, barley and other agricultural products of the region into flour.

Today, Möllan is a gathering place for many different festivities. One of the highlights is when the ruling political party, Moderaterna, uses the lawn in front of Möllan for its annual address to the residents of Skanör.
