= Skanör med Falsterbo =

- Aerial view of the peninsula

- Coat of arms

- Location within Skåne Location within Sweden
- Coordinates: 55°24′N 12°51′E
- Country: Sweden
- Province: Scania
- County: Skåne County
- Municipality: Vellinge Municipality

Area
  - Total: 5.42 km^{2} (2.09 sq mi)

Population (31 December 2010)
  - Total: 6,937
  - Density: 1,280/km^{2} (3,300/sq mi)
- Time zone: UTC+1 (CET)
  - Summer (DST): UTC+2 (CEST)

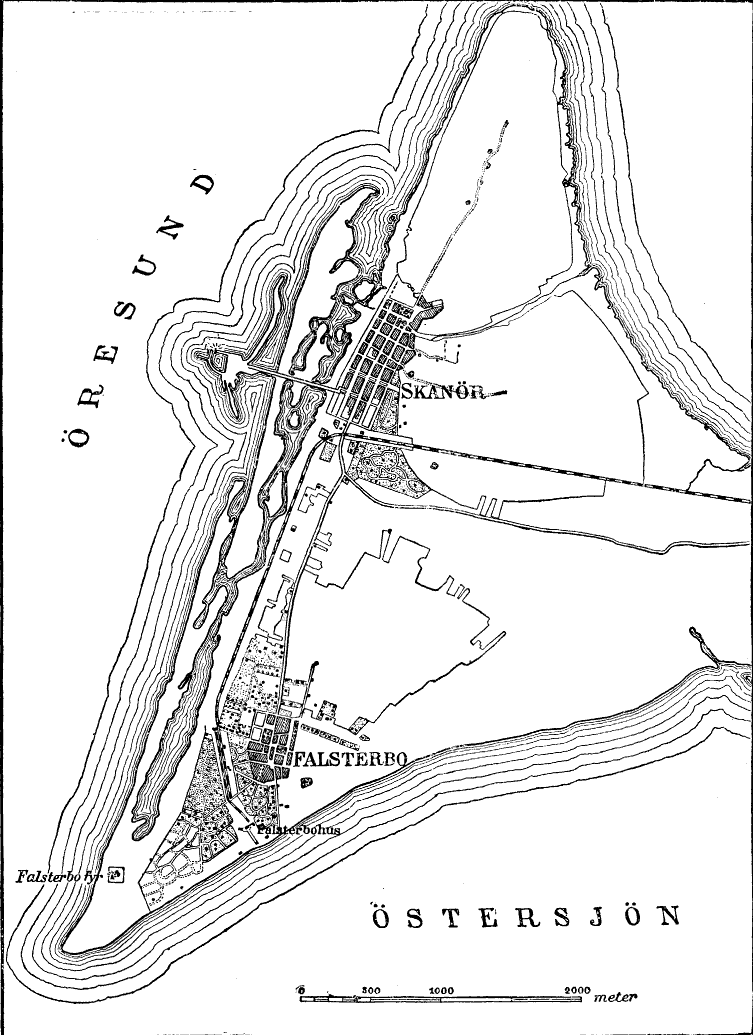
Map of Skanör med Falsterbo around 1900

Skanör med Falsterbo is a statistical locality (Swedish tätort, locality code 3672), situated in Vellinge Municipality, Skåne County, Sweden with 6,937 inhabitants in 2010. It consists of the two old towns of Skanör and Falsterbo which have grown together and were unified in 1754, but are still regarded as different communities by locals. The preposition med means with. Due to its southerly and maritime position, the locality has the mildest winters in Sweden, with winter lows barely averaging frosts.

== Background ==
It is a conurbation consisting of the two medieval towns of Skanör and Falsterbo. Both towns are located on the elongated reef-like western part of the Falsterbo Peninsula (Falsterbonäset), Falsterbo to the south and Skanör to the north. The towns are separated by a several kilometers long bank built of earth and seaweed, and have never geographically been considered the same town.

The peninsula forms the southwesternmost tip of the Scandinavian Peninsula. It marks the border between the Baltic Sea and the Öresund, the strait that separates the Danish island Zealand from the southern Swedish province of Scania.

== Geography ==
The locality is situated south of the city of Malmö, 28 km from Skanör and 30 km from Falsterbo, based on the local distance signs along the motorway. During the 20th century the towns have become affluent suburbs for people working in the Malmö-Lund region, as well as a popular site among older people who have retired from higher positions abroad or in the capital.

The peninsula is divided by the Falsterbo Canal, a waterway at the base of the Falsterbo Peninsula that shortens the route between the Øresund and the Baltic Sea, which was built to avoid mines laid in Øresund during WWII. The canal goes between the bays Höllviken (north) and Kämpingebukten (south).

== Climate ==
The Swedish meteorological institute SMHI operates a weather station in Falsterbo. Like the rest of Scania, it has an oceanic climate (Cfb), but with greater maritime effects than in Malmö for example, due to its unsheltered position on the peninsula. It is also the southernmost official station in Sweden. This combination renders it have a January mean for 1961–1990 above freezing, a very unusual occurrence in Sweden. Falsterbo is often cooler than Malmö during the day and milder during the night due to the low diurnal temperature variation. The great maritime effects as well as the ice-free winters of the region contributes to both yearly heat and cold records being subdued by Swedish standards, however specific climate events have shrunk the temperature to −24 °C (−11 °F) and raised it to 30 °C (86 °F). In 2006, Falsterbo had an absolute December minimum of 3 °C (37 °F), exceptionally mild by Swedish standards. The precipitation normal value from 1961–1990 is 490.6 millimetres (19.31 in), making it a very dry climate considering it being oceanic.

Due to the very marine nature, Falsterbo is the mildest weather station in Sweden, in spite of summer highs being far below surrounding areas. It also makes it sunnier than inland Lund, with 1902 hours of bright sunshine annually compared to the 1801 hours of Lund in the 2002–2016 period, this due to less convection build-up during spring and summer. Even being part of the Nordic mainland, Falsterbo also has a similar annual temperature to Carlisle in hypermaritime coastal England in spite of being slightly further north.

Climate data for Falsterbo (2002–2022 averages & extremes since 1901)
Month	Jan	Feb	Mar	Apr	May	Jun	Jul	Aug	Sep	Oct	Nov	Dec	Year
Record high °C (°F)	10.3 (50.5)	9.6 (49.3)	13.7 (56.7)	20.7 (69.3)	24.7 (76.5)	28.2 (82.8)	30.0 (86.0)	29.0 (84.2)	24.4 (75.9)	19.1 (66.4)	15.7 (60.3)	11.2 (52.2)	30.0 (86.0)
Mean maximum °C (°F)	7.2 (45.0)	6.4 (43.5)	10.1 (50.2)	15.5 (59.9)	21.3 (70.3)	24.2 (75.6)	26.3 (79.3)	25.8 (78.4)	21.5 (70.7)	16.8 (62.2)	12.1 (53.8)	8.4 (47.1)	27.2 (81.0)
Mean daily maximum °C (°F)	4.0 (39.2)	4.2 (39.6)	6.1 (43.0)	10.0 (50.0)	15.2 (59.4)	19.8 (67.6)	21.3 (70.3)	21.3 (70.3)	18.3 (64.9)	13.1 (55.6)	8.7 (47.7)	5.9 (42.6)	12.3 (54.2)
Daily mean °C (°F)	2.7 (36.9)	2.7 (36.9)	4.0 (39.2)	7.2 (45.0)	12.0 (53.6)	16.7 (62.1)	18.3 (64.9)	18.5 (65.3)	15.8 (60.4)	11.3 (52.3)	7.3 (45.1)	4.5 (40.1)	10.1 (50.2)
Mean daily minimum °C (°F)	1.2 (34.2)	1.2 (34.2)	1.9 (35.4)	4.4 (39.9)	9.2 (48.6)	13.6 (56.5)	15.2 (59.4)	15.7 (60.3)	13.3 (55.9)	9.4 (48.9)	5.8 (42.4)	3.0 (37.4)	7.8 (46.1)
Mean minimum °C (°F)	−6.6 (20.1)	−5.7 (21.7)	−3.6 (25.5)	−0.1 (31.8)	4.1 (39.4)	9.4 (48.9)	12.4 (54.3)	11.5 (52.7)	7.6 (45.7)	2.1 (35.8)	−1.2 (29.8)	−3.3 (26.1)	−8.5 (16.7)
Record low °C (°F)	−24.5 (−12.1)	−19.2 (−2.6)	−18.0 (−0.4)	−9.0 (15.8)	−2.7 (27.1)	3.0 (37.4)	6.6 (43.9)	7.5 (45.5)	2.0 (35.6)	−3.8 (25.2)	−8.3 (17.1)	−12.9 (8.8)	−24.5 (−12.1)
Average precipitation mm (inches)	37.5 (1.48)	27.0 (1.06)	28.0 (1.10)	24.3 (0.96)	36.0 (1.42)	48.4 (1.91)	58.3 (2.30)	84.0 (3.31)	41.9 (1.65)	54.1 (2.13)	45.9 (1.81)	43.7 (1.72)	529.1 (20.85)
Mean monthly sunshine hours	45	68	141	231	275	278	272	240	185	115	52	31	1,933
Source 1: SMHI
Source 2: SMHI Monthly Data 2002–2021

== History ==
=== Origin ===
The origin of Skanör can be traced back to the end of the 12th century and Falsterbo is believed to have arisen shortly before. In around 1220 the Danish king built the Skanör fortress. S:ta Gertrud church in Falsterbo dates back to the 13th century, possibly the 12th.

=== Growth ===
During the Late Middle Ages both towns grew in importance and wealth as during late summer and autumn the peninsula was an important centre of trade and herring fishing in the annual Scania Market (Skånemarknaden). The market was held on the beach stretch between Skanör and Falsterbo and was dominated by the north German Hanseatic cities, primarily Lübeck. The Danish king delegated specific areas along the beach to these cities, so called "fit" or "fed", where they had the right to carry out trade during the Scania Market. A large fishing village was located along the beaches of Øresund.

Soon thereafter a castle was raised in Falsterbo. In 1311 the castle was destroyed by the Hanseatic League (specifically the trade towns of Rostock, Wismar and Greifswald) in the war between these and the Danish king Erik Menved. After the war the king raised a new and larger castle in 1318 called Falsterbohus. The old castle in Skanör thus lost its importance thereafter. Olav IV of Norway, son of queen Margaret I of Denmark, died in 1387 in Falsterbohus.

After the herring population declined during the 16th century the Scania Market was dismantled and subsequently the two cities lost their former importance, but retained the town privileges, with joint administration.

=== Recent history ===
The two medieval towns Skanör and Falsterbo were united economically under the same mayor in 1754. Even so, they have geographically never been considered the same town, and they did not grow into a contiguous settlement until the late 1960s.

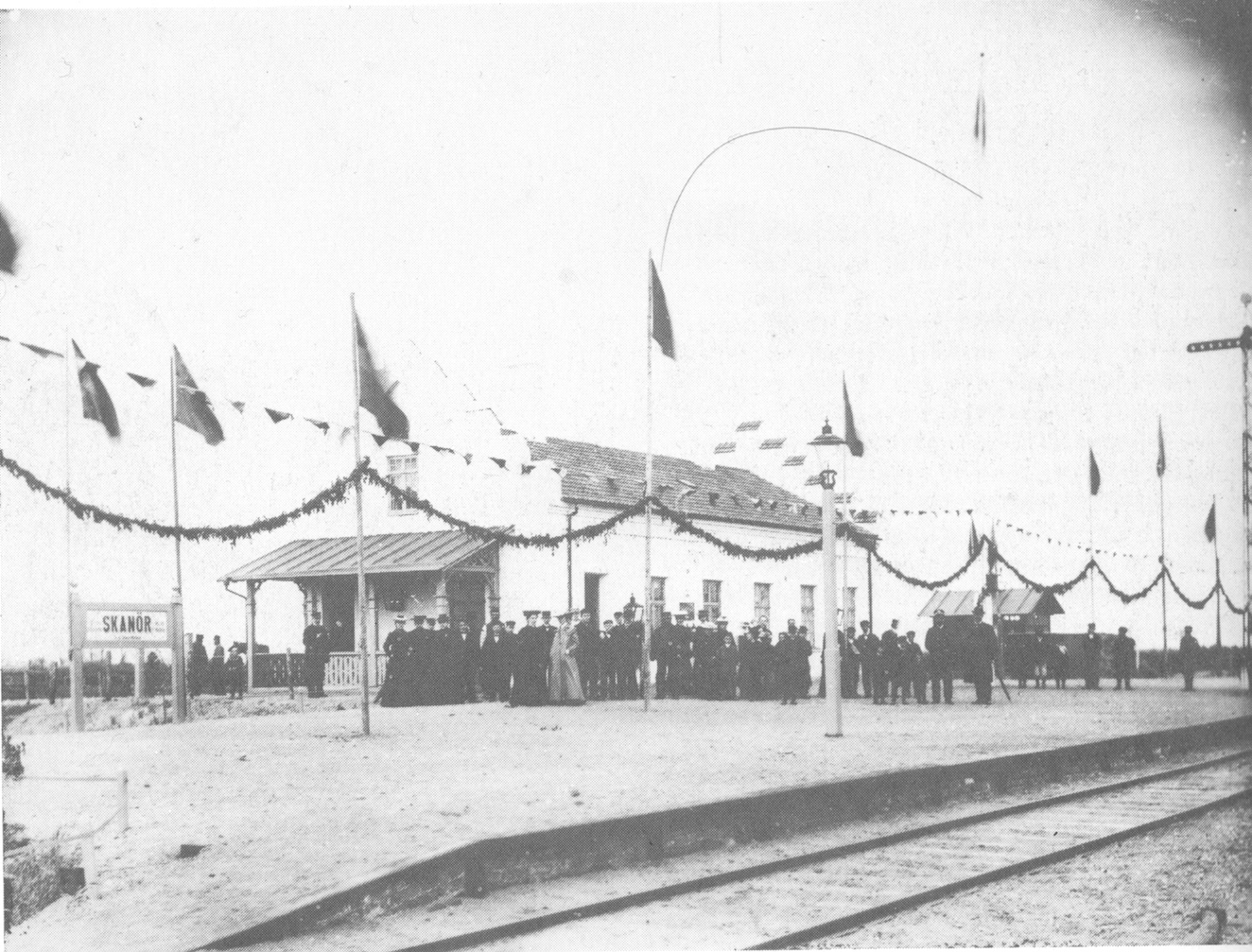
Skanör station, during the opening may 18th 1904

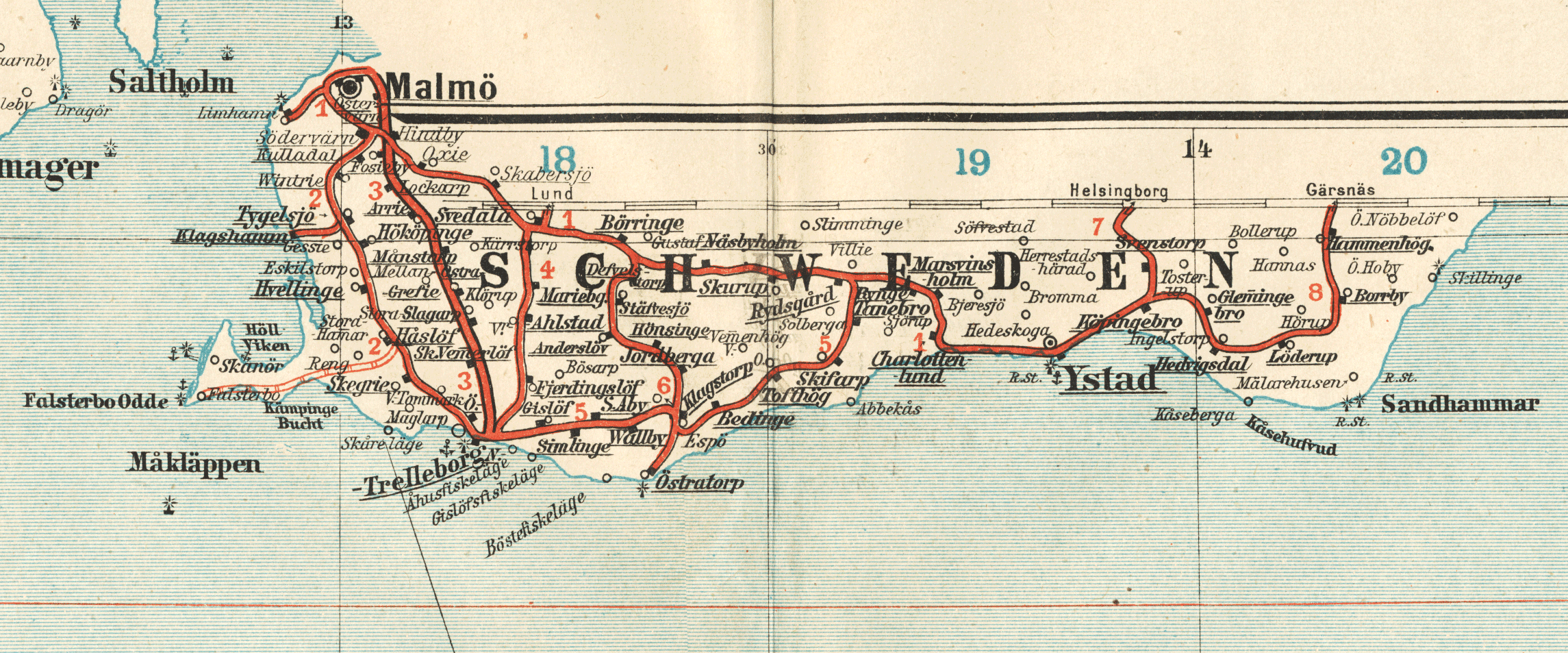
Railway Line Malmö - Trelleborg and junction to Skanör med Falsterbo

Falsterbo and Skanör remained small fishing towns until the rail line from Malmö to Falsterbo via Vellinge was built in 1904. Between 1904 and 1971 Skanör and Falsterbo each had their own railway stations. New residential areas grew up along the railway. Due to its small size Skanör med Falsterbo was the last city in Sweden to get a City Council (1934), but it had its own jurisdiction and a City Court (rådhusrätt) up until 1947. It is now a locality within Vellinge Municipality and has no administration of its own. The railway closed in 1971 and was dismantled the following year.

=== Skanör Cement factory ===
During the first world war a track was laid to the new cement factory located in the Skanör harbour. There are rumours that the cement factory was used as a depot for military equipment in case the war reached Sweden. Others claim that the factory was built under German influence only to serve as a disguise for a giant artillery foundation and that the bricks in the walls were placed upright to save costs. The cannon together with its counterpart in Køge in Denmark had as a purpose to guard the Øresund. In any case the cement factory was dismantled a few years thereafter. Of the cement factory only the foundation still exists today.

== Notability ==
Falsterbo is known for the Falsterbo Bird Observatory, since most migratory birds leave the Scandinavian Peninsula via the 5 km long reef south of Falsterbo. The same reef, and the sand beaches on the peninsula, offers some of the sea bathing of Sweden.

Falsterbo also has an annual horse show (show jumping and dressage), the Falsterbo Horse Show. Skanör used to host the annual market, Skanörs sillamarknad.

Since the 1960s, the 'rich and beautiful' from Malmö have traditionally spent their holidays in the white wooden villas on Falsterbo.

== Gallery ==
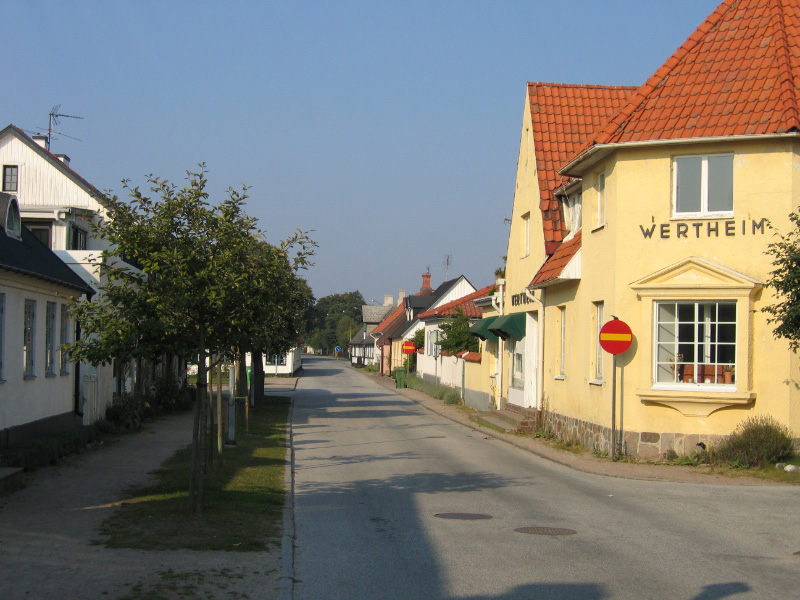
Old part of Falsterbo

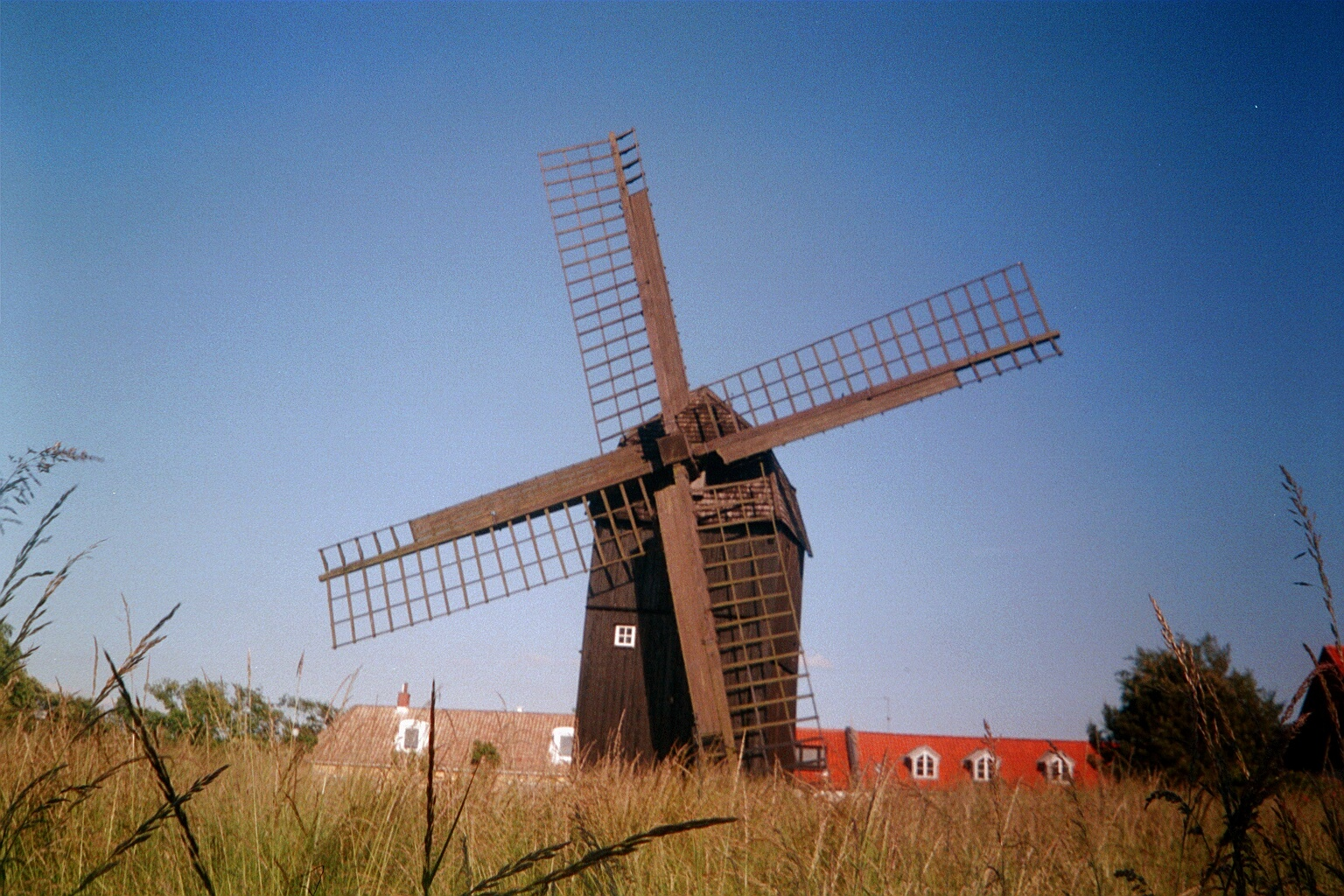
Windmill in Skanör.

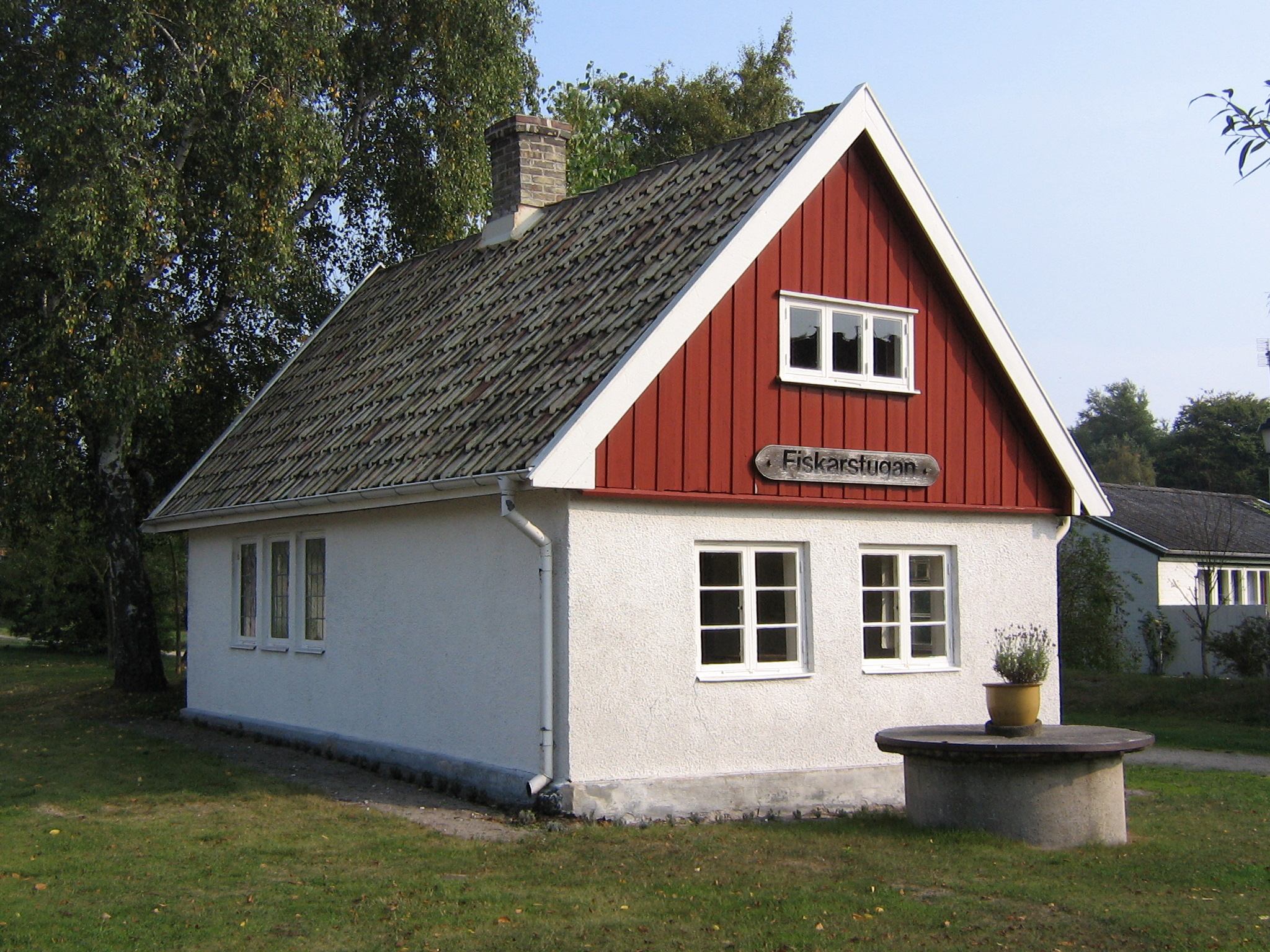
Old fishing cottage, later the first library, in Skanör.

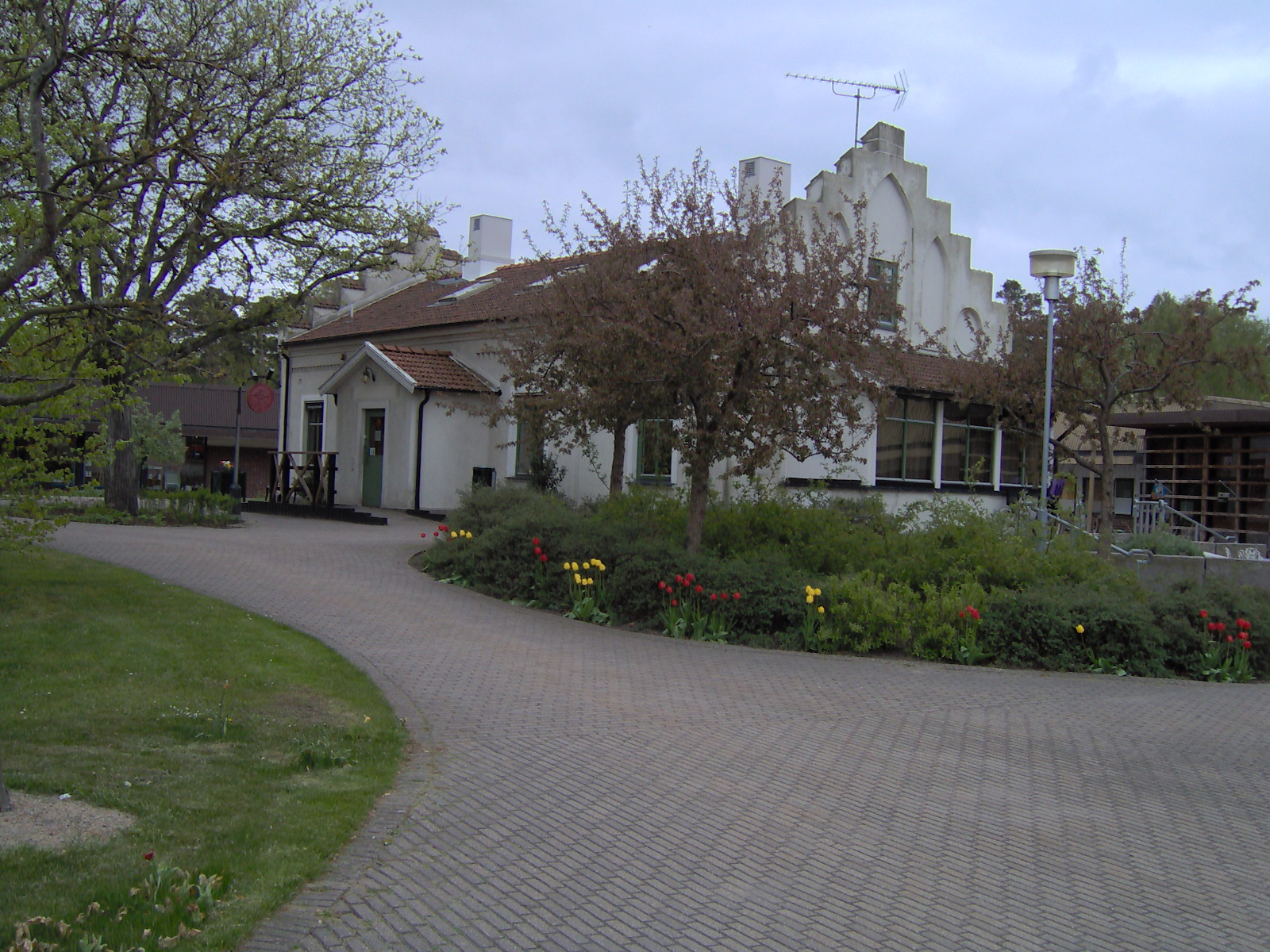
Railroad Station in Skanör.

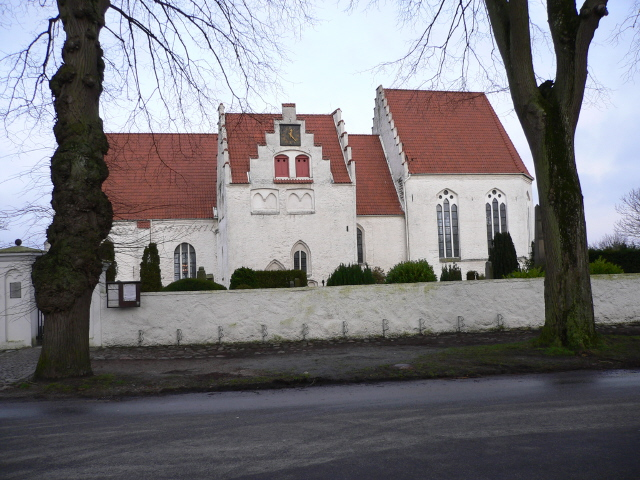
S:t Olofs church in Skanör.
