= Falsterbo =

Town in Sweden

Coordinates: 55°23′N 12°50′E

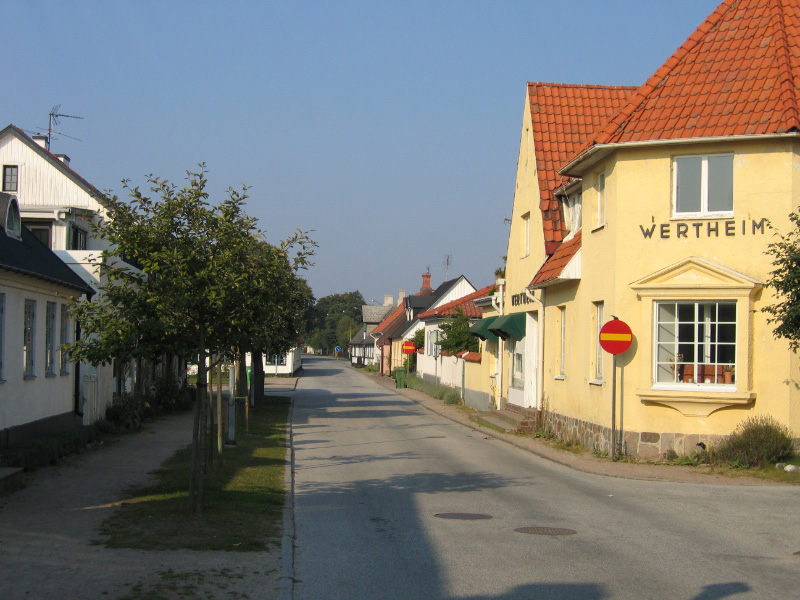
Old part of Falsterbo

Falsterbo (Swedish: [ˈfâlstɛrˌbuː], outdatedly [falstɛrˈbuː]) is a town located at the south-western tip of Sweden in Vellinge Municipality in Skåne. Falsterbo is situated in the southern part of the Falsterbo peninsula. It is part of Skanör med Falsterbo, one of Sweden's historical cities.

Aerial view

== Climate ==
Climate data for Falsterbo (1991–2020)
Month	Jan	Feb	Mar	Apr	May	Jun	Jul	Aug	Sep	Oct	Nov	Dec	Year
Record high °C (°F)	10.3 (50.5)	9.5 (49.1)	12.6 (54.7)	20.7 (69.3)	25.0 (77.0)	27.8 (82.0)	30.2 (86.4)	29.5 (85.1)	24.4 (75.9)	19.1 (66.4)	15.7 (60.3)	11.2 (52.2)	30.2 (86.4)
Mean maximum °C (°F)	6.9 (44.4)	6.4 (43.5)	9.4 (48.9)	15.5 (59.9)	20.8 (69.4)	23.6 (74.5)	25.9 (78.6)	25.5 (77.9)	21.1 (70.0)	16.4 (61.5)	11.7 (53.1)	8.3 (46.9)	27.0 (80.6)
Mean daily maximum °C (°F)	3.2 (37.8)	3.0 (37.4)	5.3 (41.5)	9.9 (49.8)	14.9 (58.8)	18.7 (65.7)	21.3 (70.3)	21.2 (70.2)	17.3 (63.1)	12.2 (54.0)	7.8 (46.0)	4.7 (40.5)	11.6 (52.9)
Daily mean °C (°F)	1.8 (35.2)	1.4 (34.5)	3.1 (37.6)	6.8 (44.2)	11.5 (52.7)	15.3 (59.5)	17.9 (64.2)	18.0 (64.4)	14.7 (58.5)	10.3 (50.5)	6.3 (43.3)	3.4 (38.1)	9.2 (48.6)
Mean daily minimum °C (°F)	0.3 (32.5)	0.0 (32.0)	1.3 (34.3)	4.5 (40.1)	8.8 (47.8)	12.6 (54.7)	15.2 (59.4)	15.5 (59.9)	12.5 (54.5)	8.6 (47.5)	4.9 (40.8)	1.9 (35.4)	7.2 (44.9)
Mean minimum °C (°F)	−6.6 (20.1)	−5.7 (21.7)	−3.4 (25.9)	−0.1 (31.8)	4.0 (39.2)	9.0 (48.2)	11.8 (53.2)	11.5 (52.7)	7.6 (45.7)	2.2 (36.0)	−1.2 (29.8)	−4.0 (24.8)	−8.3 (17.1)
Record low °C (°F)	−12.9 (8.8)	−13.2 (8.2)	−9.2 (15.4)	−4.0 (24.8)	0.8 (33.4)	5.7 (42.3)	9.5 (49.1)	8.0 (46.4)	4.2 (39.6)	−3.8 (25.2)	−8.3 (17.1)	−12.7 (9.1)	−13.2 (8.2)
Average precipitation mm (inches)	35.6 (1.40)	26.2 (1.03)	28.0 (1.10)	27.4 (1.08)	37.0 (1.46)	49.8 (1.96)	53.5 (2.11)	72.6 (2.86)	52.7 (2.07)	48.4 (1.91)	45.1 (1.78)	42.6 (1.68)	518.9 (20.43)
Source: SMHI Open Data

See Skanör med Falsterbo#Climate for more data.

== History ==
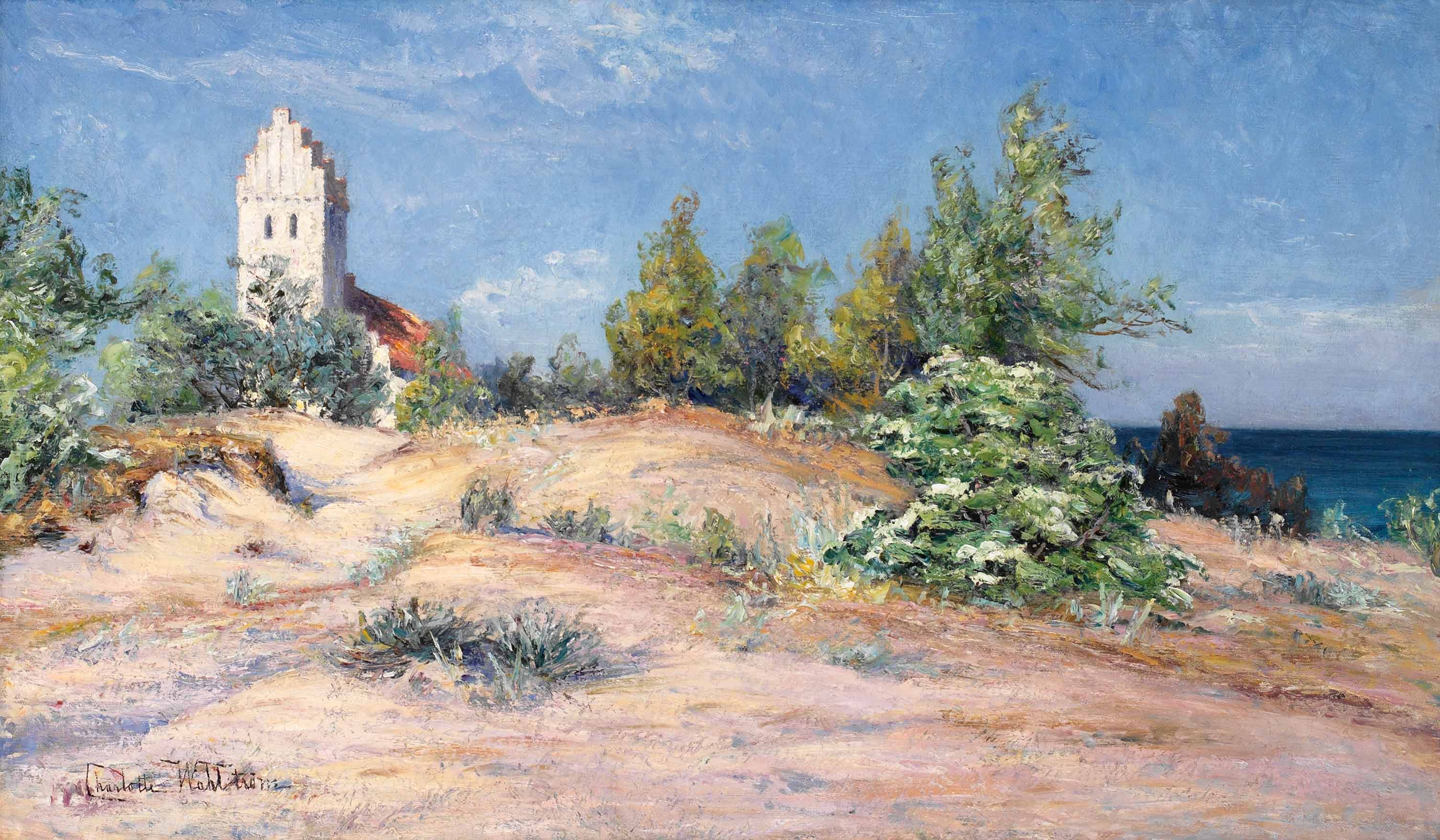
Summer morning, Falsterbo Charlotte Wahlström (1849–1924)

Falsterbo historically enjoyed trading privileges with the Hanseatic League. During the Middle Ages, it was a rich and prestigious town owing to its location in a center of trade and herring fishery. On the beach between Falsterbo and neighboring town Skanör was the Scania Market where merchants from various parts of Europe had fixed market places.

Scania Market was a major fish market which took place annually starting about 1200. The market became an important trade center on the Baltic Sea and remained so for 250 years; it was a major source of the Hanseatic League's wealth. The rich herring fishing around the Falsterbo Peninsula accounted for the market's popularity, but the market declined in importance during the 15th century when herring populations decreased. The cities were politically merged into a single city, Skanör med Falsterbo.

== Local attractions ==
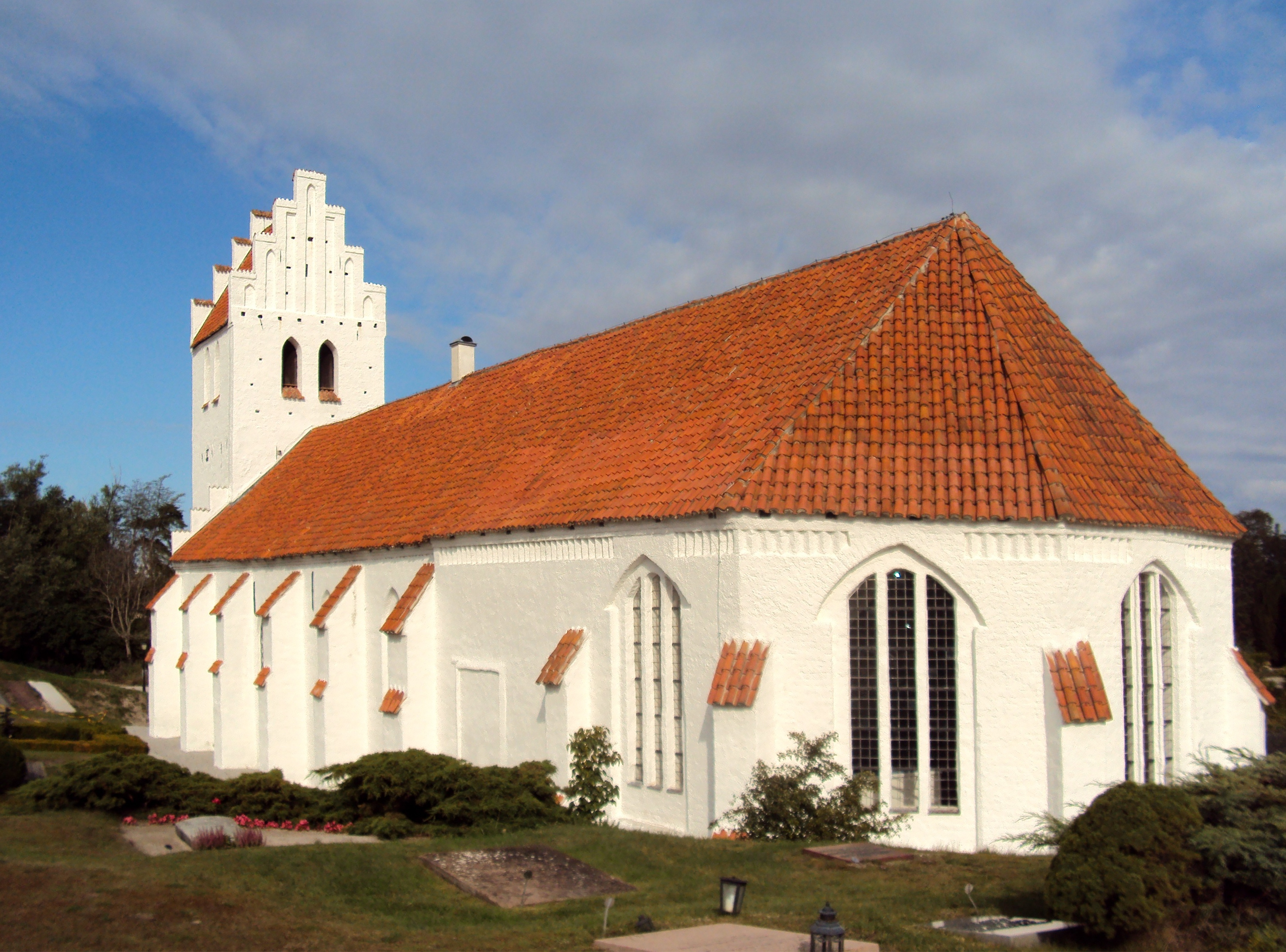
Falsterbo church

Falsterbo is mostly known as a holiday destination where people go to spend their summer vacations. The beaches of Falsterbo are known for their white sand and family-friendly bathing opportunities. Falsterbo is also known for one of the better golf courses in Europe – Falsterbo Golf Club. Another attraction in Falsterbo is the annual International Horse Jumping Grand Prix (part of the Falsterbo Horse Show) every July.

Local landmarks include Falsterbo Lighthouse which lies on the site of the oldest known beacon in Scandinavia. Other sites of note include Falsterbo Bird Observatory, Falsterbo Museum and the historic Falsterbo church.

Falsterbo is also known for its Bird Observatory, which regularly undertakes bird ringing. The bird observatory has ringed over a million birds.

Sweden's oldest nature reserve, Måkläppen, an important breeding area for shorebirds and seals, is nearby.

== Falsterbohus ==
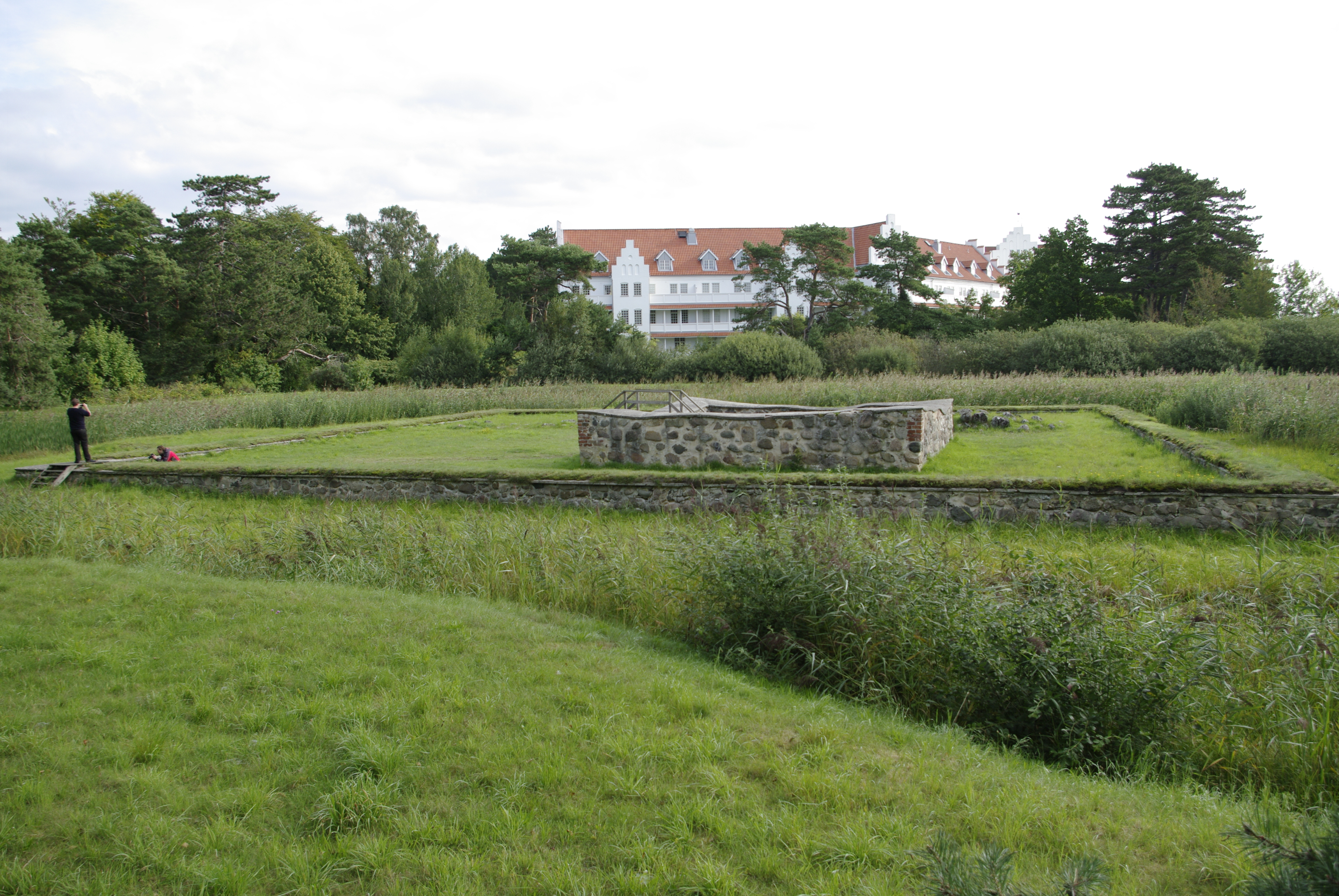
Falsterbohus and castle ruins

Falsterbohus was the name of a number of historic castles dating from the mid-13th century. The building now known as Falsterbohus was built in 1908. There have been a number of archaeological excavations where the original castles stood. The first was in the early 20th century by Georg Fredrik Johansson Karlin (1859–1939), founder of Kulturen, the Cultural Museum of Southern Sweden located in Lund.

A second and more extensive excavation was conducted between 1934 and 1935 by Ragnar Blomqvist. Most of the artifacts from the earlier excavations are located in the Cultural Museum in Lund and Falsterbo Cultural Museum. Most of the archaeological finds from the second excavations are in Stockholm.

== See also ==
- Falsterbo canal

== Other sources ==
- Blomqvist, Ragnar Falsterbohus in (Lund, Sweden: Kulturen. 1950)
