= List of museums in Piedmont =

This is a list of museums in Piedmont, Italy.

Name	Image	Description	Address	City	Coordinates
Accorsi - Ometto Museum		Decorative arts museum	Via Po, 55	Turin	45.06630°N 7.69304°E
Casa Cavassa		Renaissance-style palace, houses the Museo Civico Casa Cavassa	Via S. Giovanni, 5, 12037	Saluzzo	44.64437°N 7.4864°E
Castello della Manta		Castle	Via De Rege Thesauro, 5	Manta	
Castello ducale di Agliè		Castle	Piazza Castello, 2	Agliè	
Castle of Govone		Part of the Residences of the Royal House of Savoy	Piazza Roma, 1	Govone	
Castle of Moncalieri		Part of the Residences of the Royal House of Savoy		Moncalieri	
Castle of Pollenzo		Part of the Residences of the Royal House of Savoy	Piazza Vittorio Emanuele II, 8	Pollentia	
Castle of Racconigi		Palace and park, part of the Residences of the Royal House of Savoy	Via Francesco Morosini, 3	Racconigi	
Castle of Rivoli		Houses the Museo d'Arte Contemporanea, part of the Residences of the Royal House of Savoy	Piazzale Mafalda di Savoia, 10098	Rivoli	45.07003°N 7.51025°E
Chiesa di San Filippo		Roman Catholic church and museum dedicated to St John Bosco		Chieri	
Cittadella of Alessandria		18th-century star fort and citadel	Via Pavia, 2	Alessandria	
Faraggiana Ferrandi Natural History Museum		Museum of natural history	Via Gaudenzio Ferrari	Novara	
Forte Albertino		Former fort and museum	Piazza Vittorio Veneto	Vinadio	44.30732°N 7.1727°E
Forte Bramafam		19th-century fort	Strada Forte Bramafam	Bardonecchia	
Fort of Exilles		Fortified complex	10050 Exilles	Susa Valley	
Juventus Museum		Museum dedicated to the Juventus Football Club, located in the Juventus Stadium complex	Via Druento, 153/42	Turin	
Mole Antonelliana		Tower designed by Alessandro Antonelli	Via Montebello, 20	Turin	45.068889°N 7.69306°E
Museo Borgogna (Vercelli)		Art museum	Via Antonio Borgogna, 4	Vercelli	45.32551°N 8.42677°E
Museo Civico d'Arte Antica		Art museum, housed in the Palazzo Madama		Turin	
Museo Civico Federico Eusebio		Archaeology and natural history museum	Via Vittorio Emanuele II, 19	Cuneo	
Museo Egizio		Archaeological museum focusing on Egyptian artifacts	Via Accademia delle Scienze, 6	Turin	45.06839°N 7.68443°E
Museo Francesco Borgogna		Art museum	Via Francesco Borgogna	Vercelli	
Museo Nazionale dell'Automobile		Automobile museum	Corso Unità d'Italia, 40	Turin	45.03168°N 7.67417°E
Museum of Antiquities, Turin		Archaeology museum	Via XX Settembre 88c and via 20 Settembre, 88	Turin	
Museum of Human Anatomy Luigi Rolando		Part of the Turin University Museums, museum on human anatomy	Corso Massimo d'Azeglio 52	Turin	45.0495°N 7.6804°E
Museum of Oriental Art		Asian art museum, part of the Fondazione Torino Musei	Via San Domenico 9/11	Turin	45.07441°N 7.67935°E
Museum of the Risorgimento		Museum dedicated to the unification of Italy, housed in the Palazzo Carignano	Via Accademia delle Scienze, 5	Turin	45.06911°N 7.68516°E
Palace of Venaria		Part of the Residences of the Royal House of Savoy	Piazza della Repubblica, 4	Venaria Reale	45.13583°N 7.62352°E
Palazzo Mazzetti		Baroque palace, houses the Museo e Pinacoteca Civica	Corso Vittorio Alfieri 357	Asti	
Palazzo Silva		15th-century residence and civic museum		Domodossola	
Palazzina di caccia of Stupinigi		Royal hunting lodge, part of the Residences of the Royal House of Savoy	Piazza Principe Amedeo, 7	Nichelino	
Pinacoteca Albertina		Art museum, managed by the Accademia Albertina di Belle Arti	Via Accademia Albertina, 8	Turin	
Pinacoteca Giovanni e Marella Agnelli		Art gallery	Via Nizza, 230	Turin	
Royal Armoury of Turin		Part of the Musei Reali di Torino, collection of royal arms and armour	Piazza Castello 191	Turin	45.07093°N 7.68684°E
Royal Library of Turin		Housed in the Royal Palace of Turin			
Royal Palace of Turin		Part of the Residences of the Royal House of Savoy	Piazzetta Reale 1	Turin	
Royal Palace of Valcasotto		Castle	12075 Garessio	Garessio	
Sabauda Gallery		Royal art collection of the House of Savoy	Via XX Settembre, 86	Turin	45.07417°N 7.68611°E
Synagogue of Casale Monferrato		16th-century Baroque synagogue and Jewish art and history museum		Casale Monferrato	
The National Cinema Museum		Motion picture museum, housed in the Mole Antonelliana	Via Montebello, 22	Turin	45.06889°N 7.69306°E
Turin Civic Gallery of Modern and Contemporary Art		Art gallery, part of the Fondazione Torino Musei	31 via Magenta	Turin	
Turin City Museum of Ancient Art		Art museum	Piazza Castello	Turin	45.0711°N 7.68548°E
Turin Museum of Natural History		Natural history museum	Via Giovanni Giolitti, 36	Turin	45.06459°N 7.68867°E
Valentino Castle		Part of the Residences of the Royal House of Savoy	Viale Mattioli, 39	Turin	
Villa della Regina		Part of the Residences of the Royal House of Savoy	Strada Comunale Santa Margherita, 79	Turin	
