= Fritz (elephant) =

Elephant donated to Carlo Felice of Savoia

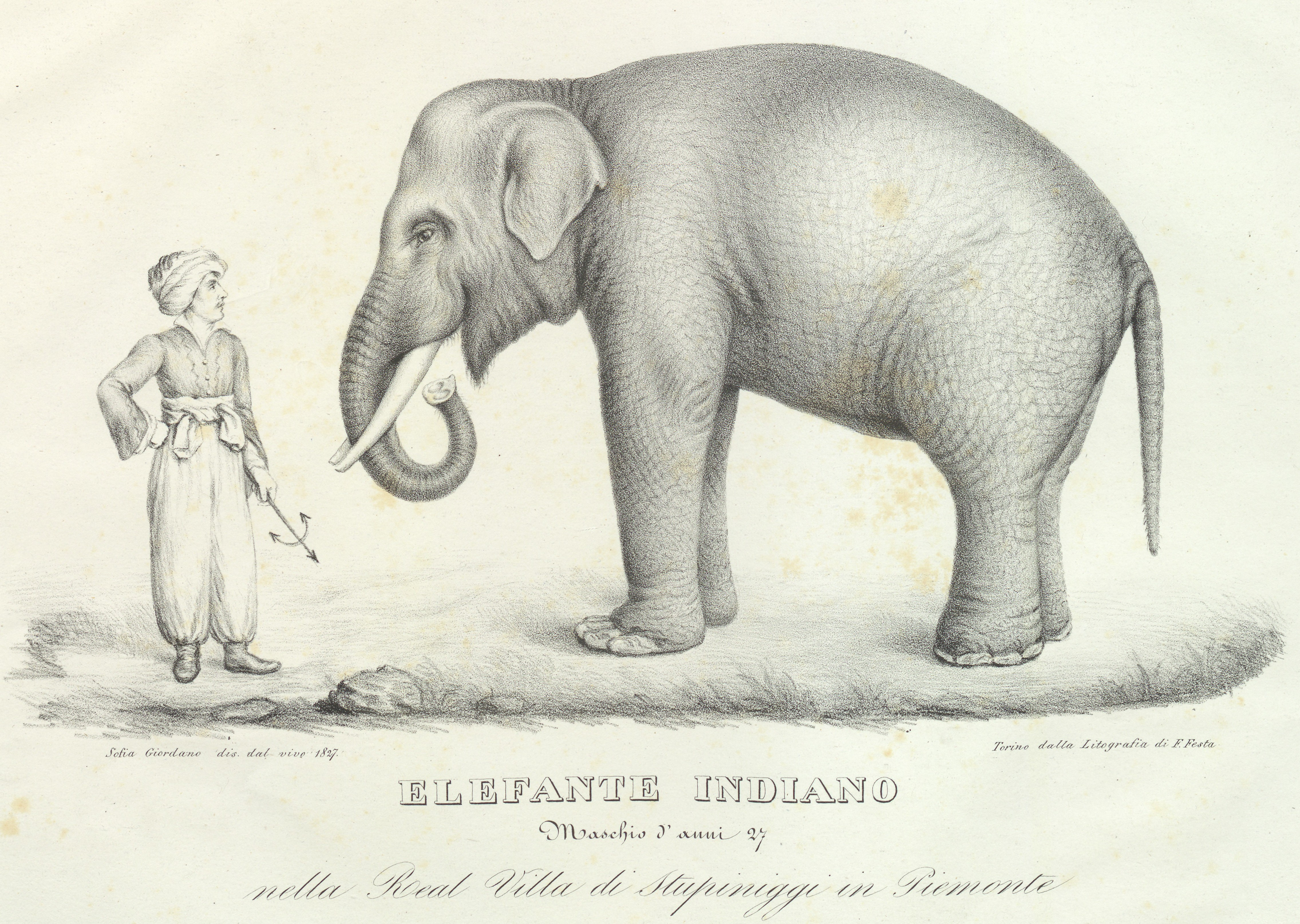
Portrait of Fritz the elephant by Sofia Giordano, 1827

Fritz (c. 1800 – 8 November 1852) was an Asian elephant that lived in the menagerie of the Palazzina di caccia of Stupinigi from 1827 to 1852. Presented by the Wāli of Egypt, Muhammad Ali, to Charles Felix, King of Sardinia, the animal became a famous attraction at the court of the House of Savoy and in the city of Turin, as well as the subject of artistic representations and scientific studies. Following his death in 1852, Fritz was taxidermied, and both his mounted body and skeleton entered the zoological collections of Turin, now preserved at the Regional Museum of Natural Sciences in Turin.

== History ==
=== Arrival at Stupinigi ===
The presence of animals on the royal estate of Stupinigi dated back to at least the late 18th century, when, in an effort to counter the progressive depletion of wildlife caused by hunting expeditions undertaken by the nobility, some areas of the palace were allocated to the breeding of deer and pheasants. During the first decades of the 19th century, this led to the development of a proper menagerie, which gradually expanded through gifts and purchases to include exotic animals such as mouflons, gazelles, chamois and kangaroos.

Among the various gifts received was Fritz the elephant, who arrived at Stupinigi as part of a diplomatic exchange—facilitated in part by the art collector and diplomat Bernardino Drovetti—between Charles Felix and the Egyptian viceroy Muhammad Ali. During those years, Charles Felix, seeking to strengthen relations with Egypt, had already sent Muhammad Ali one hundred Merino sheep, which were reciprocated with the gift of a male elephant approximately twenty-seven years old.

The elephant was embarked at Alexandria on 24 October 1826, and his journey lasted several months, reaching Genoa during the winter. Due to unfavorable weather conditions, it was decided to keep him in the Ligurian city throughout the winter before transporting him to Turin in the summer of 1827. From that point onward, the elephant lived at Stupinigi, where he remained for the following twenty-five years. The animal's arrival at Stupinigi required the conversion of part of the former stables to accommodate him: enclosed areas were arranged to shelter Fritz from the cold, a large courtyard was prepared to allow him to move about, and a large circular pool equipped with a ramp was constructed to make it easier for the animal to enter the water. He was also assigned a personal keeper responsible for cleaning him, taking him on walks and feeding him.

=== Life at Stupinigi ===
Lithograph of Fritz in the gardens of Stupinigi by Enrico Gonin, dating from 1835.

After arriving at Stupinigi, Fritz remained there for twenty-five years, quickly becoming one of the main attractions of the Savoy residence, partly thanks to his gentle nature and familiarity with people. Over time, he also learned to appreciate the music and singing of his keeper, moving in rhythm with his melodies.

During his stay at the Savoy court, Fritz was subjected to an unusual and expensive diet that was unsuitable for an elephant's nutritional needs. His daily food ration consisted of fifty loaves of bread, twenty-four cabbages, butter, rice, and tobacco, as well as one or two pints of wine. Contemporary accounts recorded Fritz's considerable tobacco consumption and his continuous exposure to secondhand smoke produced by his keeper. This diet had consequences for Fritz's health, as he repeatedly suffered from indigestion and dental problems. In particular, a severe case of indigestion caused by excessive consumption of chestnuts was reportedly treated by administering Málaga wine to the elephant. As for his dental problems, the animal lost several teeth, two of which were particularly noteworthy: the first, recovered by the court cabinetmaker Giacomo Marchino, was used to make a crucifix, which was preserved on the altar of the chapel at Agliè Castle; the second, which Fritz is believed to have pulled out himself because of the pain, was presented to Charles Albert of Sardinia.

Not only was Fritz's diet unusual, but so was his grooming routine: the animal was thoroughly washed once a month, and his skin was polished with four pounds of butter.

=== Popularity and scientific studies ===
The daguerreotype attributed to Faustino Curlo aroused skepticism among Turin's photographic community because of doubts about the possibility of keeping an elephant motionless for such a long exposure.

From the moment of his arrival at Stupinigi, Fritz aroused great curiosity among both the general public and Turin's cultural circles, giving rise to a veritable "Fritzmania", as members of the nobility, the middle classes, scholars and ordinary people flocked to Stupinigi to observe the animal. He also attracted the attention of several artists who chose to depict him in their works. Among them was Sofia Giordano, who drew the elephant from life in 1827. Her drawing was subsequently reproduced by Felice Festa as a lithograph entitled Elefante indiano maschio di anni 27 nella Real Villa di Stupiniggi in Piemonte, which became widely circulated. In 1835, Enrico Gonin also depicted Fritz during one of his walks, surrounded by a crowd of curious spectators who had gathered at Stupinigi to witness the event. This image was likewise circulated through a lithographic reproduction by Demetrio Festa, entitled R. Castello di Stupinigi. A final depiction of Fritz dates from around 1850, when the animal was photographed in a daguerreotype attributed to Faustino Curlo, entitled L'Elefante di Torino che poi morì pazzo. According to the Historical Archives of the City of Turin, this image is the only known daguerreotype depicting an animal produced in Italy. At the time, the photograph caused considerable surprise and skepticism, as the long exposure times required raised doubts about whether it was actually possible to keep an elephant motionless in front of a camera lens for such a prolonged period.

Fritz was not merely an attraction and a curiosity, but also provided an opportunity for scientific observation. His physical condition, diet and behavior were carefully recorded by Casimiro Roddi, the manager of the menagerie, with the assistance of the zoologists Giuseppe Gené and Filippo De Filippi, both of whom served as directors of Turin's Zoological Museum at different times.

=== Decline and death ===
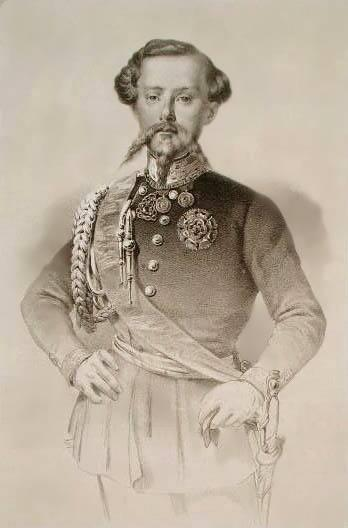
King Victor Emmanuel II decided to have Fritz killed because of the high cost of maintaining the animal.

During the final years of his life, Fritz's behavior changed. Following the death of his longtime keeper, the animal became increasingly distrustful and difficult to control, also showing reluctance to leave his enclosure. Rumors began to spread throughout the city that the elephant had gone mad, while damaged tree trunks, fences and feeding troughs were reportedly observed in the woods and facilities of the menagerie, and were interpreted as signs of Fritz's aggression. The situation eventually deteriorated when, one day, the new keeper attempted to lead Fritz out of his enclosure, but the elephant seized him with his trunk and threw him to the ground, killing him.

Meanwhile, Fritz's situation had been further complicated by the accession to the throne of Victor Emmanuel II, who was dissatisfied with the high cost of maintaining the elephant. These expenses, combined with the aggression displayed by the animal and the generally high costs of the menagerie, led to the decision to put him down. The decision gave rise to various rumors among the city's inhabitants, who claimed that Fritz's alleged madness was merely an excuse used by the king to rid himself of the expensive animal. These rumors were made all the more pointed by the fact that Victor Emmanuel II was, at the time, raising funds for the establishment of a zoological garden in central Turin.

Finally, on 8 November 1852, Fritz was killed by asphyxiation caused by carbon monoxide produced by a stove specifically prepared for the animal's death.

== Remains and legacy ==
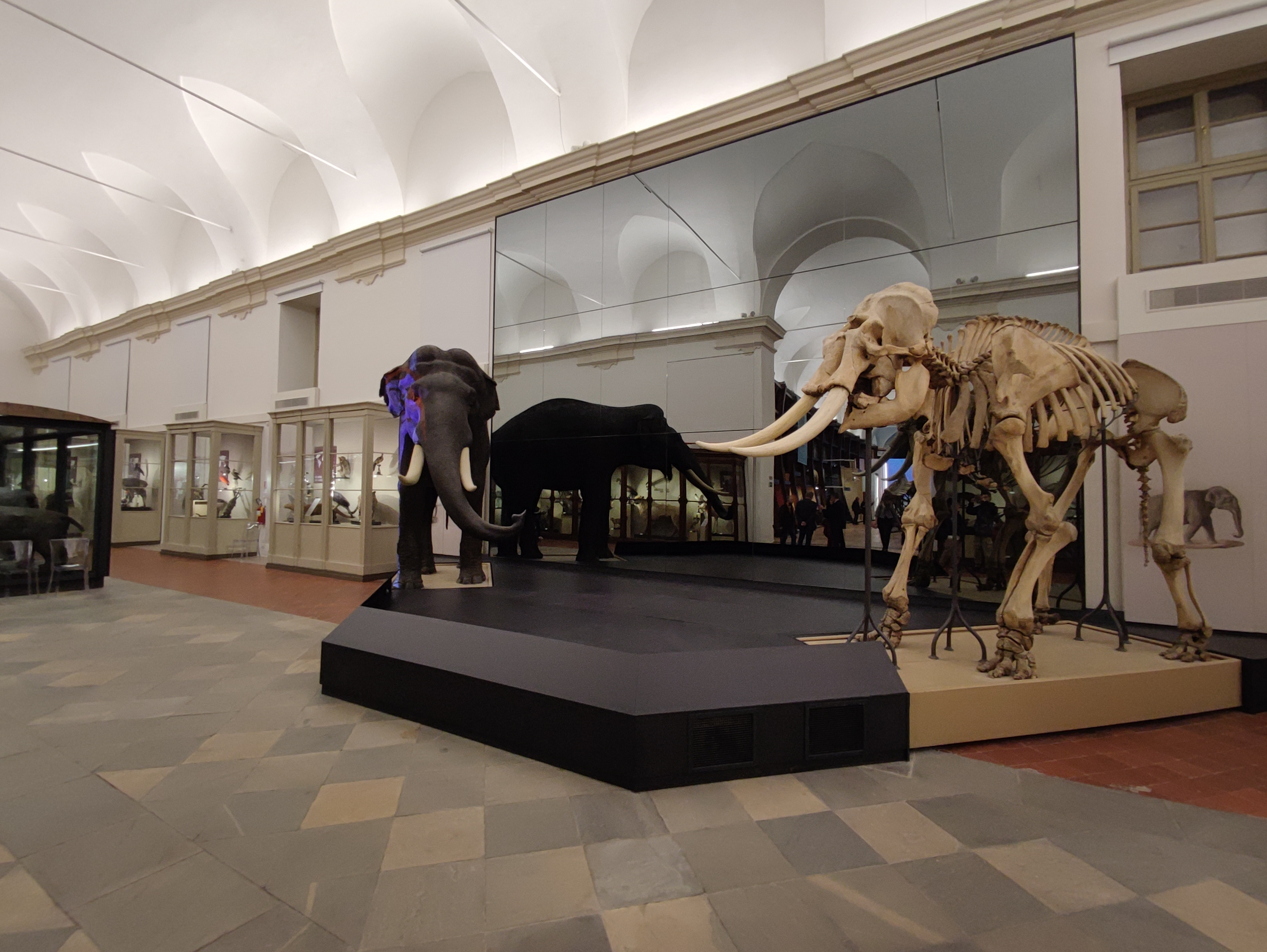
The bones of Fritz the elephant on display at the Regional Museum of Natural Sciences in Turin.

Following his death, Fritz's body was transferred to the Zoological Museum of the Royal University of Turin. The animal was taxidermied by Francesco Comba, and his remains were used for scientific research, including studies of histology and the retina of mammals.

His taxidermied body and skeleton subsequently became part of Turin's zoological collections. The elephant's skeleton occupies a central position in the exhibition at the Regional Museum of Natural Sciences in Turin, in the hall displaying taxidermied specimens and skeletons from the historical collections of the University of Turin.

In 2015, Fritz and his history were the subject of the exhibition Fritz. Un elefante a corte, organized at the Palazzina di caccia of Stupinigi by the Regional Museum of Natural Sciences in Turin and the Fondazione Ordine Mauriziano. For the exhibition, students from the Associazione Scuole Tecniche San Carlo created a resin replica of the animal which, before reaching Stupinigi, was transported through central Turin aboard a semi-trailer truck, attracting the curiosity of passersby.

In 2026, as part of the renovation of the grounds of the Palazzina di caccia of Stupinigi, a landscaping project in the palace gardens commemorated the location of the pool in which the elephant used to bathe.

== Bibliography ==
- Fantuzzi, Cristina; Rolla, Elena (2015). "In posa Fritz!". 101 storie su Torino che non ti hanno mai raccontato (in Italian). Newton Compton Editori. ISBN 9788854183087.
- Schembri Volpe, Daniela (2019). "Dall'Asia alla corte dei Savoia: storia di un elefante triste". Le incredibili curiosità di Torino (in Italian). Newton Compton Editori. ISBN 9788822737717.
