= Nina Giustiniani =

Italian noblewoman and patriot (1807–1841)

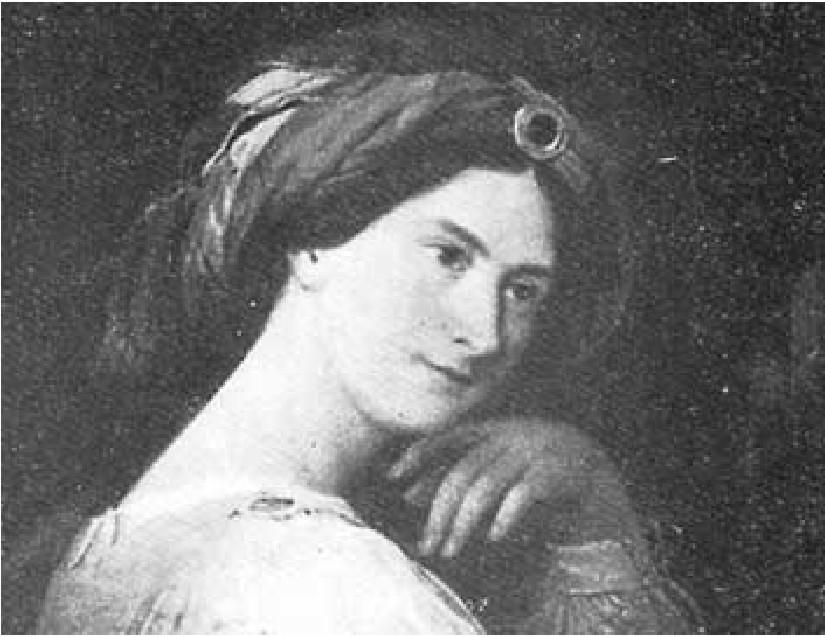
- Portrait of Nina Giustiniani by Ferdinando Cavalleri (1832)
- Born: Anna Schiaffino Giustiniani; August 9, 1807; Paris, France
- Died: April 30, 1841 (aged 33); Genoa, Kingdom of Sardinia
- Resting place: Chiesa dei Cappuccini, Genoa
- Other names: Nina, Leopardina
- Known for: Patriotism, friendship with Camillo Benso di Cavour
- Spouse: Stefano Giustiniani
- Children: 3
- Parent(s): Giuseppe Schiaffino, Maddalena Corvetto

Anna Schiaffino Giustiniani, known as Nina Giustiniani (Paris, 9 August 1807 – Genoa, 30 April 1841), was an Italian noblewoman and patriot. She is remembered for her influential role in Genoese republican circles and for her close, emotionally significant friendship with the future statesman Camillo Benso, Count of Cavour.

== Early life ==
Nina was born in Paris to Baron Giuseppe Schiaffino, originally from Recco, and Maddalena Corvetto, known as Manin, daughter of Luigi Emanuele Corvetto—an economist, French finance minister, and prominent figure of the Ligurian Republic. Her father served King Louis XVIII after the Restoration and, in 1817, became French consul general in Genoa. The family relocated from their Parisian residence to Liguria, settling in Palazzo Doria-Spinola in Genoa.

Nina received a classical education from tutors of various nationalities. At nineteen, she married Marchese Stefano Giustiniani, seven years her senior, a member of one of Genoa’s most influential families.

== Patriotism ==
In Genoa, from 1827, Nina Giustiniani hosted a prominent salon that became a hub for republican and liberal ideas. She supported the cause of Italian unification and independence, raising funds and promoting the ideals of the Giovine Italia movement founded by Giuseppe Mazzini. Her salon was frequented by figures such as Agostino Spinola, Giacomo Balbi Piovera, Nicola Cambiaso, and Bianca Rebizzo.

== Relationship with Cavour ==
Nina met Camillo Benso, Count of Cavour, in 1830 when he arrived in Genoa as a young army officer. Their relationship, characterized by intense friendship and emotional intimacy, included a prolific correspondence—at times up to 150 letters in a single year. Cavour, who affectionately called her "Nina", found in her a confidante and intellectual companion. The literary circle around Giacomo Leopardi gave her the nickname "Leopardina".

The relationship was complicated by her marriage and social conventions of the time. Nevertheless, the bond between Nina and Cavour remained significant, with their last meeting occurring in Voltri before Cavour’s departure for Paris in 1834.

== Death ==
In the final years of her life, Nina suffered from mental health difficulties and lived in relative seclusion. On the night of 23 to 24 April 1841, she attempted suicide by jumping from a window of Palazzo Lercari. She survived the fall but died from her injuries on 30 April 1841 at the age of 33. She was buried in the Chiesa dei Cappuccini in Genoa. Neither her husband nor her family wished for her to be buried in their respective family tombs.
