= Fritz Reichl =

Austrian architect (1890–1959)

- Born: February 2, 1890; Baden bei Wien, Austria-Hungary
- Died: January 1, 1959 (aged 68); Los Angeles, California (aged 68 years)
- Occupations: Architect and Artist
- Parents: Louis Reichl (father); Fanny Reichl (mother)

Fritz Reichl (February 2, 1890 – January 1, 1959) was an Austrian architect based in Los Angeles, California.

== Biography ==
=== Early life ===
Reichl was born in Baden bei Wien, Austria. His father was Louis Reichl and his mother, Fanny Reichl. His parents were Jewish. He attended the School of Applied Arts in Vienna. He then studied architecture in Vienna, graduating in 1914. During World War I, he served in Serbia, Bosnia and Italy.

=== Career ===
He established his architectural firm in Vienna in 1925. In 1939, he moved to Turkey to escape the Nazis; he first worked in Istanbul and later in Ankara.

He moved to the United States in the late 1940s. After arriving in New York City, he soon moved to Los Angeles, California, working for Richard Neutra. In 1953, he started an architectural firm with Maxwell Starkman. They designed tract homes and shopping malls in Los Angeles and Pittsburgh.

=== Death ===
He died in Los Angeles, California. He was sixty-eight years old.

== Gallery ==
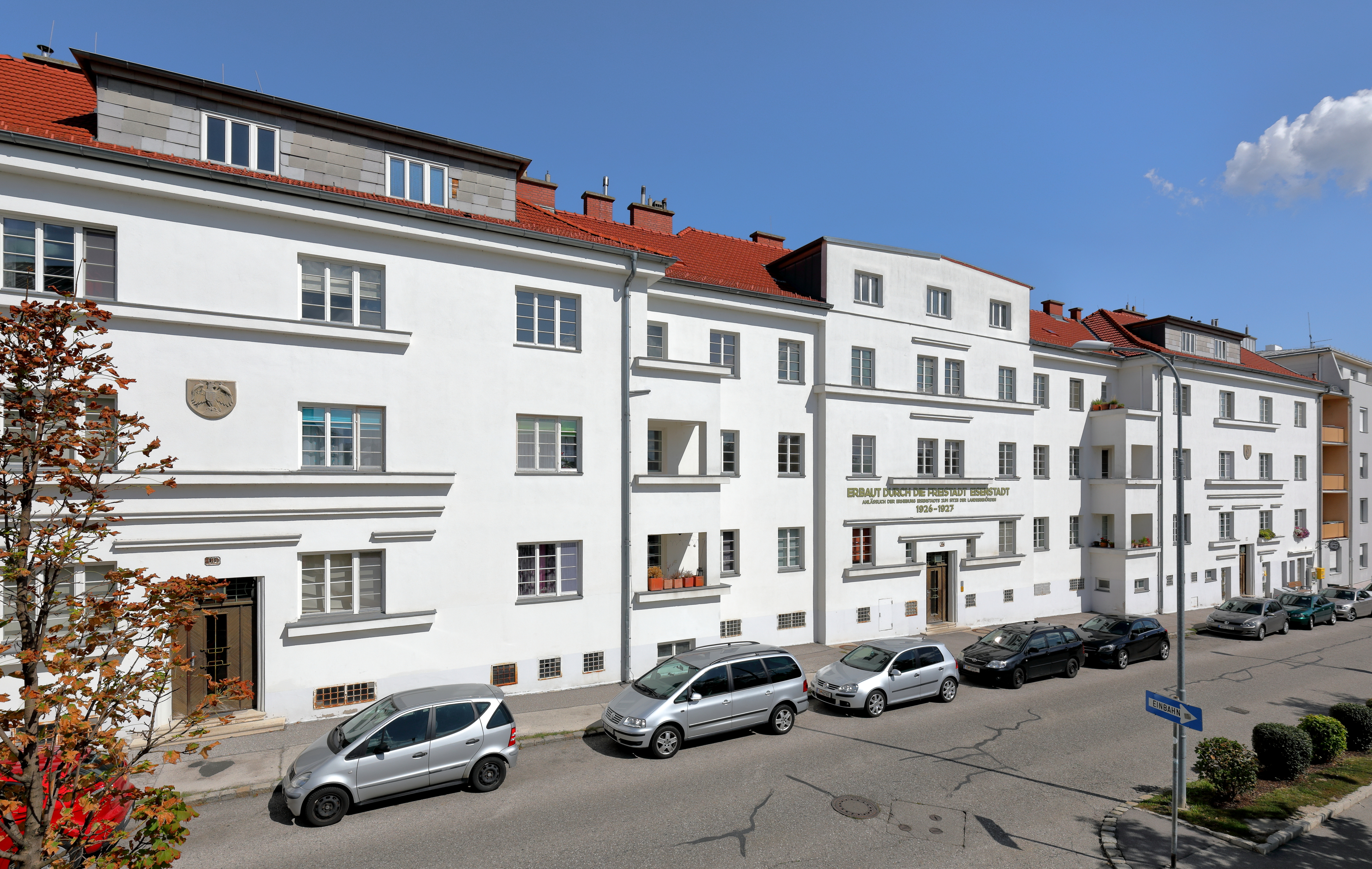
Beamtenwohnhäuser, Eisenstadt (1926–1927)

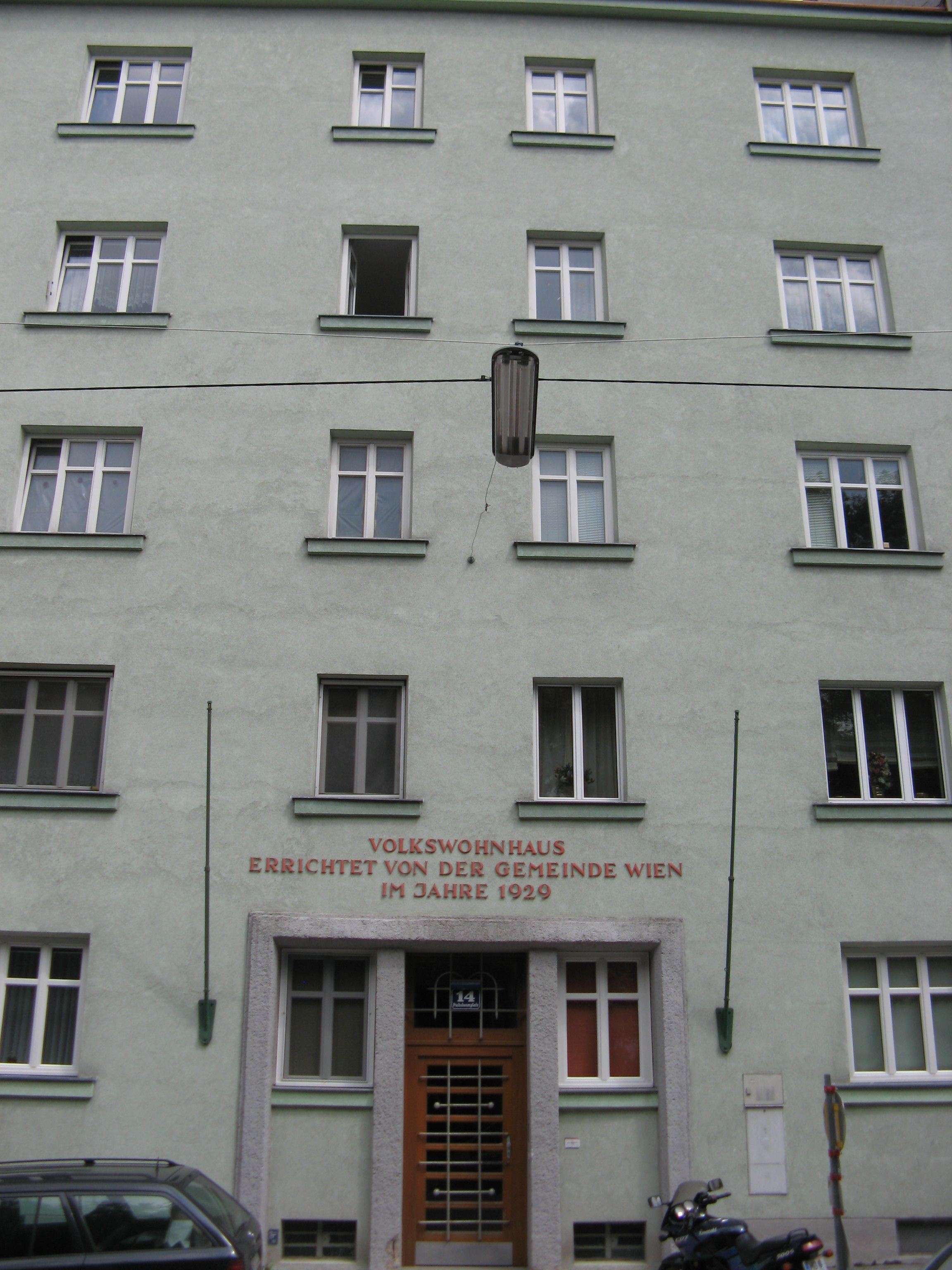
Volkswohnhaus der Gemeinde Wien, Puchsbaumplatz 14, Vienna 10 (1929)

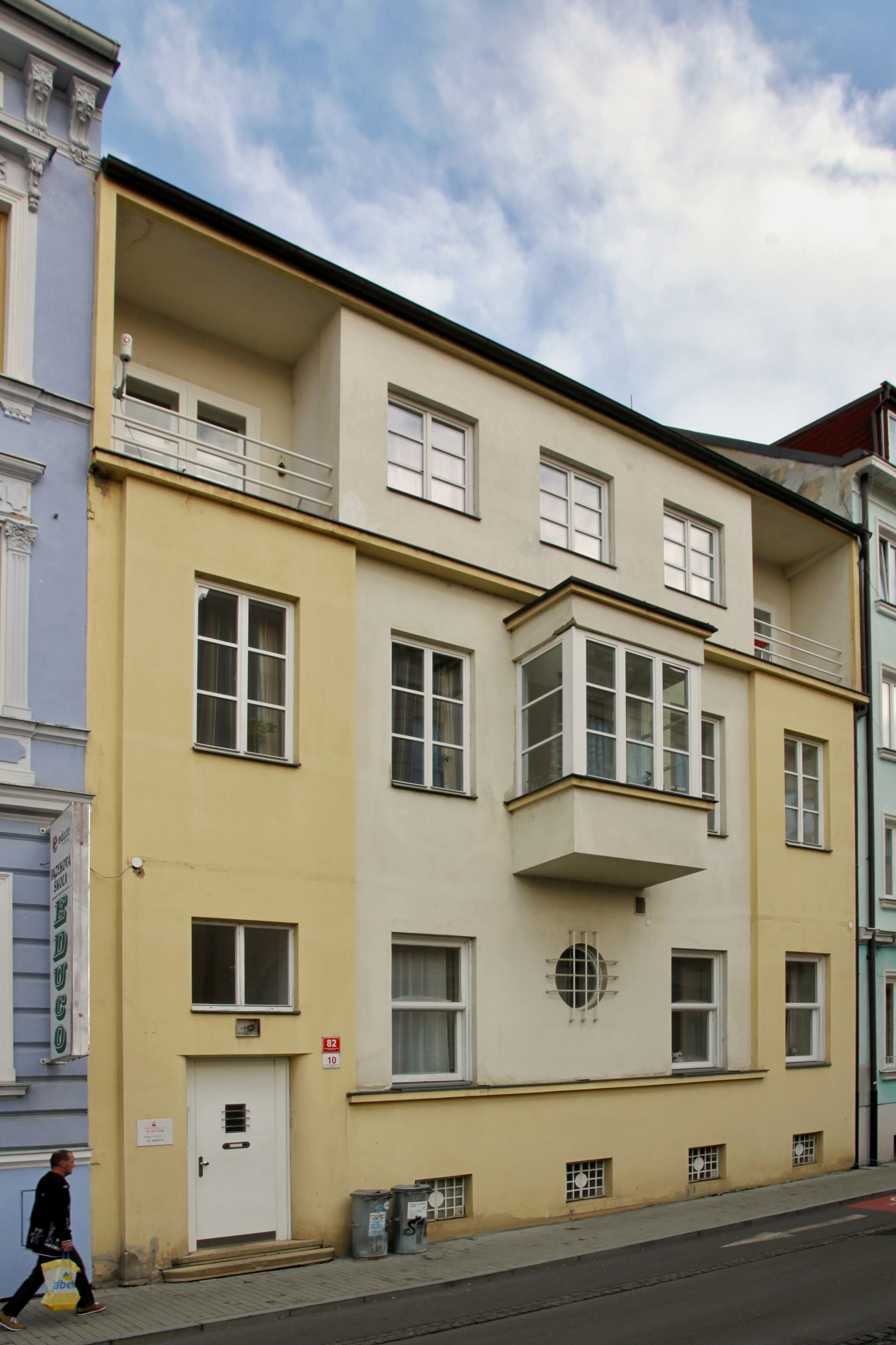
House Hesky, Stitneho 10, České Budějovice (1931)

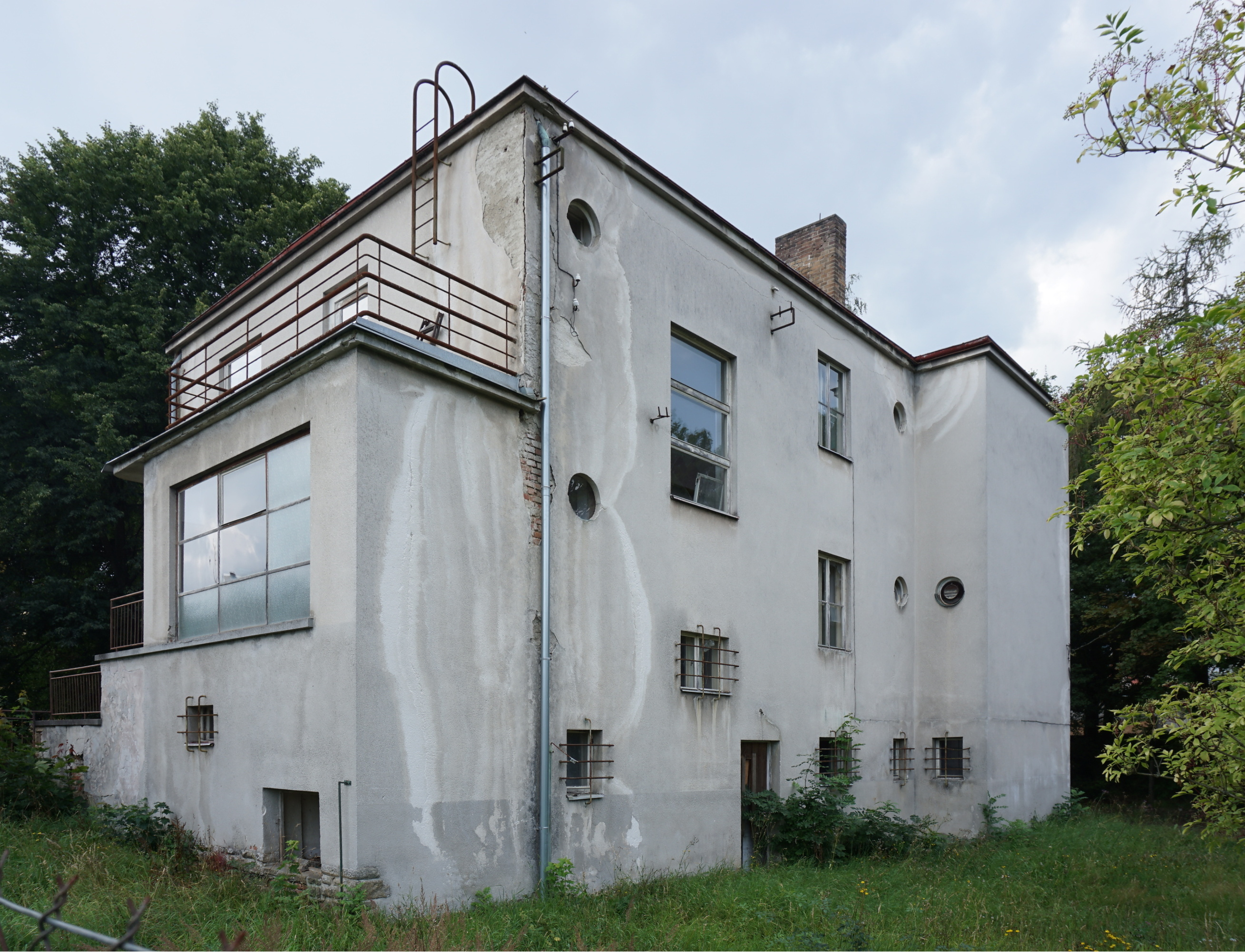
Villa J. N. Kral, Prachatice (1931–1932)
