= Sofia Giordano =

Italian artist (1778–1829)

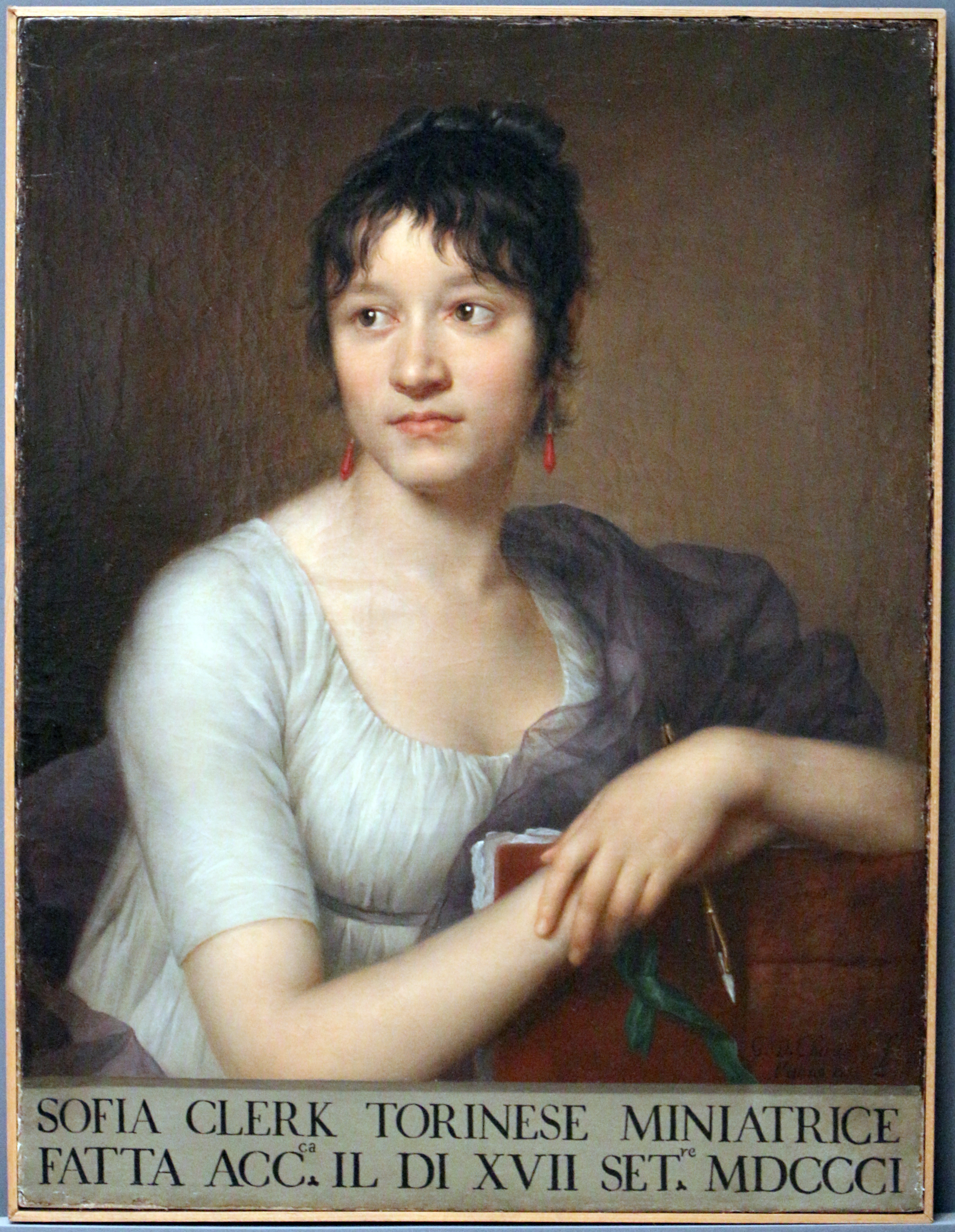
Portrait of Sofia Giordano by Giovanni Domenico Cherubini

Sofia Giordano (30 April 1778 – 26 April 1829) was an Italian painter.

== Life and work ==
Giordano was born to poor parents in Turin as Sofia Clerc. Her maiden name has been also given variously as Clerk, Le Clerc, Leclerk, and other variants on the same.

Early in life, she evinced a talent for drawing, and the painter Pietro Jacopo Palmieri (1737-1804) recommended further study, in which she was supported by banker Giacinto Vinay. At 18, she went to Rome to study miniature painting and pastel with Therese Maron. During this time, she became a member of the Accademia Nazionale di San Luca, upon which occasion her portrait, still held by the Accademia, was painted by Giovanni Domenico Cherubini (1754-1815). She produced three pastel copies during this period of her study before turning to painting miniatures on ivory.

After a few years, Vinay demanded she return to Turin, where she became member of the Accademia delle Scienze di Torino. In 1803, she married the surgeon Giovanni Giordano, continuing to paint and exhibit under her maiden name. She continued to produce pastels, and began working in oil on canvas as well. In 1812, the Turin Academy awarded her a gold medal for her work. Giordano had two children and died of a nervous fever.

Giordano's work won the acclaim of Napoleon Bonaparte, among others. A pastel portrait of Giacinto Vinay is in the collection of the Palazzo Mazzetti in Asti.
