= Museo Francesco Borgogna =

Museum in Vercelli, Piedmont, Italy

Coordinates: 45.3256°N 8.4269°E

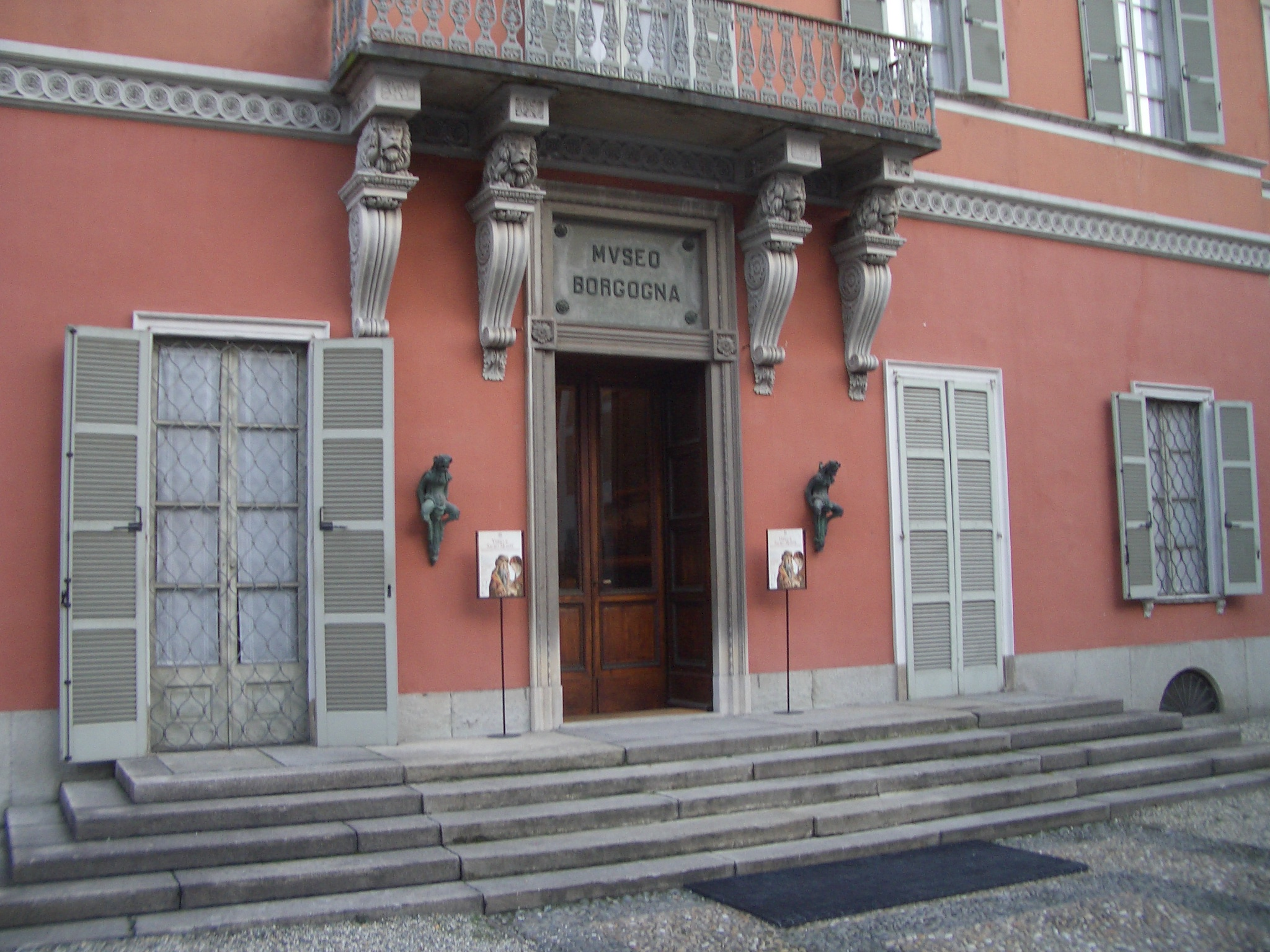
Entrance to the museum in 2003

The Francesco Borgogna Museum, located on Via Francesco Borgogna near the town center of Vercelli in the region of Piedmont, displays a collection of paintings, frescoes, sculpture, tapestries, and other artifacts. The works originate from the 14th to the 20th century.

== History ==
The museum and the foundation supporting it were established in 1907, by Antonio Borgogna and his friend Vincenzo Laviny, and dedicated to Antonio's father. The Borgogna family and its collections formed the core of the museum. The entrance to the museum has a posthumous bronze bust of Antonio (1910) by the Vercelli sculptor Fracesco Porzio . The museum was expanded by an additional wing designed by Giuseppe Leblis between 1912 and 1915. In 1932, works of arts from the Institute of Fine Arts of Vercelli, as well as from suppressed churches and monasteries were assembled here.

The collections include works by Gerolamo and Giovanni Battista Giovenone, Bernardino Lanino, Defendente Ferrari, Gaudenzio Ferrari, the school of Giovanni Martino Spanzotti, Titian, Bernardino Luini, Francesco Francia, il Sodoma, Ludovico Carracci, Carlo Maratta, Stefano Ussi, Domenico Induno, Teofilo Patini, Gaetano Chierici, Giacomo Favretto, and Nicola Mónti. as well as paintings from the Flemish and Netherlands. Most of the collection was assembled through the art-market during 1880 to 1906. The collection has numerous sculptures from the late 19th and early 20th centuries.
