= Johny Fritz =

Luxembourgish composer

Johny Fritz (born December 14, 1944) is a Luxembourgish composer.
