= Ferdinando Cavalleri =

Italian painter (1794–1867)

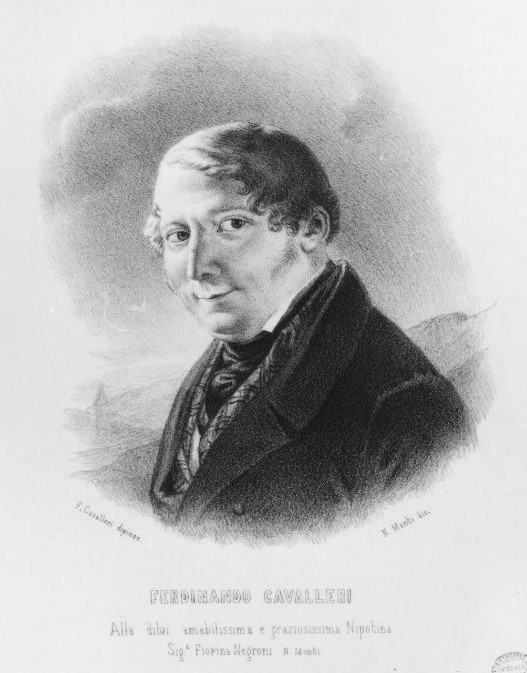
Portrait by Niccola Monti

Ferdinando Cavalleri (1794–1867) was an Italian painter, specializing in history subjects and portrait, active in a Neoclassical-style.

== Life ==
He was born at Turin, and studied art at Rome. He was in later life a professor at the Academy of St. Luke in Rome.

== Works ==
His works include:

- Beatrice Cenci ascending the Scaffold.
- The Burning of Old St Paul's.
- The Death of Leonardo da Vinci.
- Prince Eugene, after the Battle of Peterwardein.
- Self-Portrait (in the Uffizi, Florence).
