= Nicola Antonio Monti =

Italian painter

Nicola Antonio Monti (16 August 1736 - 19 December 1795) was an Italian painter of the Neoclassical style.

== Biography ==
Born in Ascoli Piceno, he first trained locally under Biagio Miniera, then traveled to Rome to study under Pompeo Batoni. He was active in Ascoli, Perugia, Rome, and Fermo. He painted for the Church of Santa Maria in Monterone, Rome. The Cathedral of Ascoli Piceno has a painting depicting the Miracle of Bread and Fishes (1782). He painted a St Anne, Virgin, and young St John the Baptist (1769) for the church of San Domenico in Ascoli. He died in poverty.
