= Nicola Mónti =

Italian painter

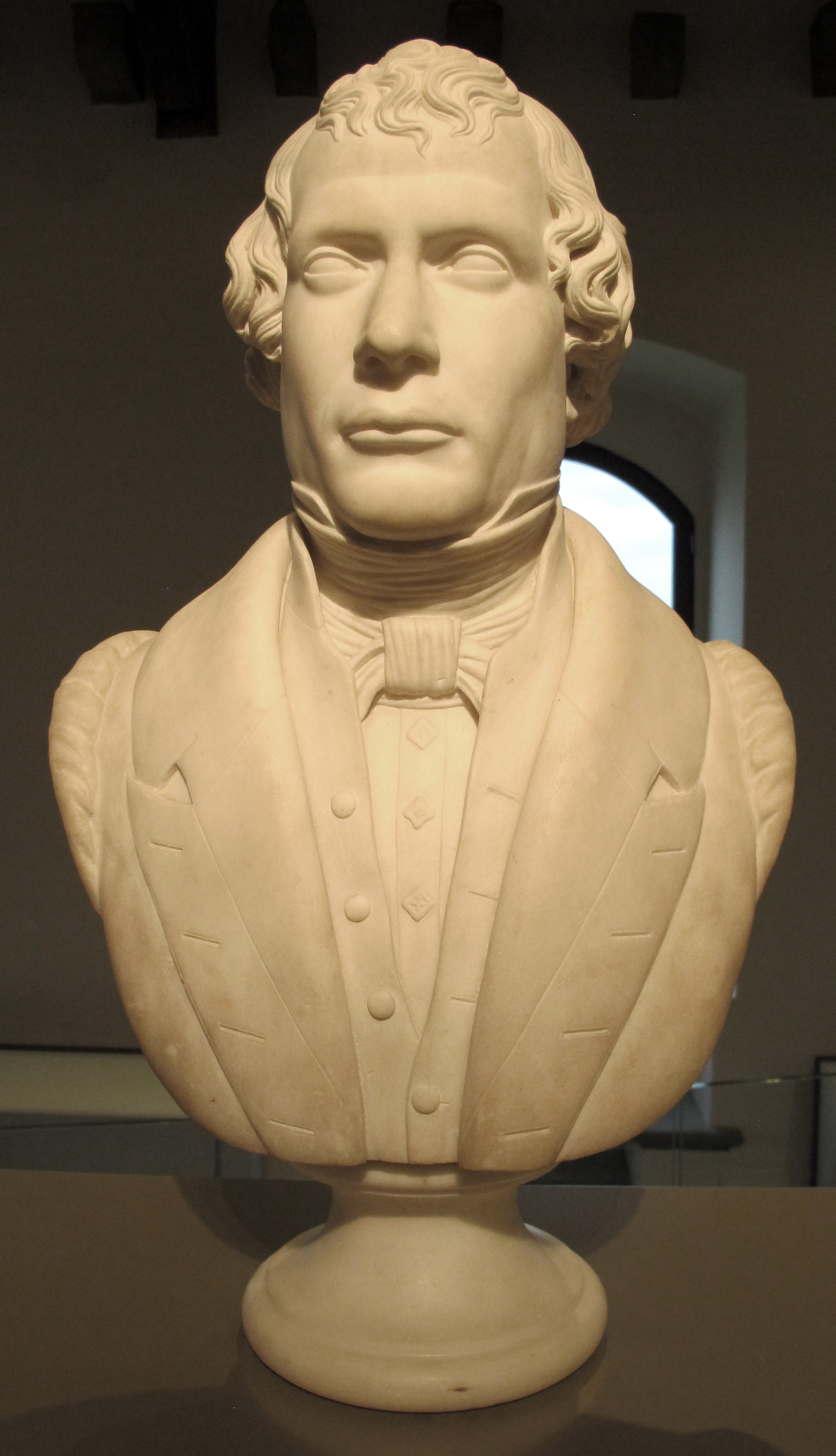
Bust by Lorenzo Bartolini

Nicola Mónti or Niccola Monti (August 28, 1780 – 1863) was an Italian painter, active in a neoclassical style, painting mainly historical subjects.

== Biography ==
Monti was born in Pistoia, where his initial training was with Jean-Baptiste Frederic Desmarais. He moved to Florence where he worked for Pietro Benvenuti, and also attended the Academy of Fine Arts in Florence. For the church of the Umilta in Pistoia, he painted a fresco depicting Cain cursed by God and San Felice exorcises an witch. He also worked in Poland and St Petersburg, Russia in 1818–1819. He returned to Florence to fresco a hall in the Palazzo Pitti. For the basilica of the Santissima Annunziata, he frescoed a Resurrection of Lazarus. He painted a historical canvas depicting Michelangelo suspends work of the Sculpture of Moses, now in private collections. He published an autobiography titled Memorie Inutile (1860). He died in Cortona.

There is a painter Nicola Antonio Monti from Ascoli Piceno (August 16, 1736 – December 19, 1795) and an opera singer Nicola Monti.
