= Palazzo Mazzetti =

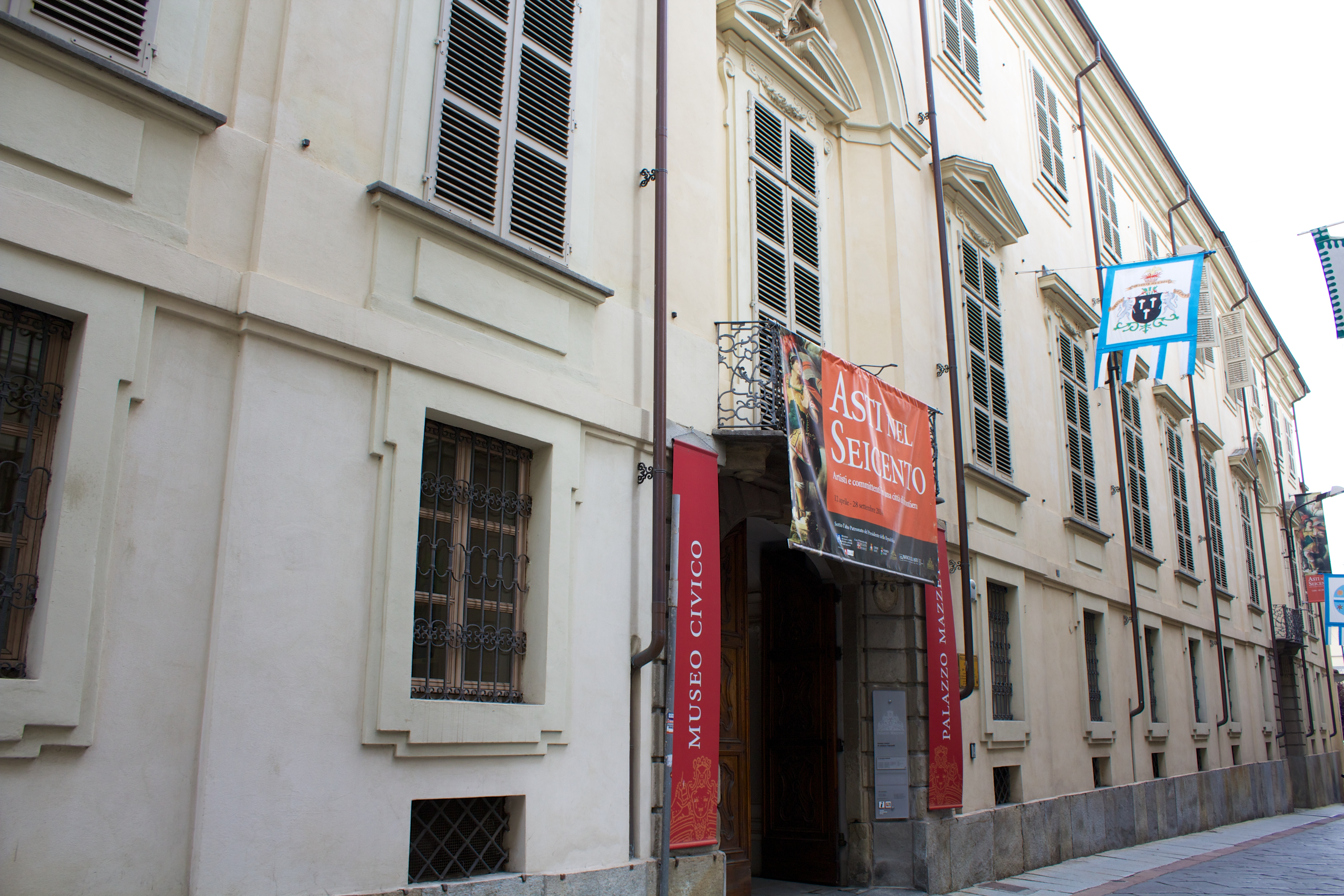
- Established: 1940
- Location: Asti, Piedmont, Italy
- Coordinates: 44.899386°N 8.200497°E
- Type: Art museum
- Collections: Paintings, sculptures, decorative arts, archaeology, etc
- Owner: Fondazione Cassa di Risparmio di Asti

The Palazzo Mazzetti is a Baroque art museum in Asti, Italy, which overlooks the Contrada Maestra (the current Corso Alfieri). It is the seat of the pinacoteca (civic art gallery) of Asti.

== The Museum and Art Gallery ==
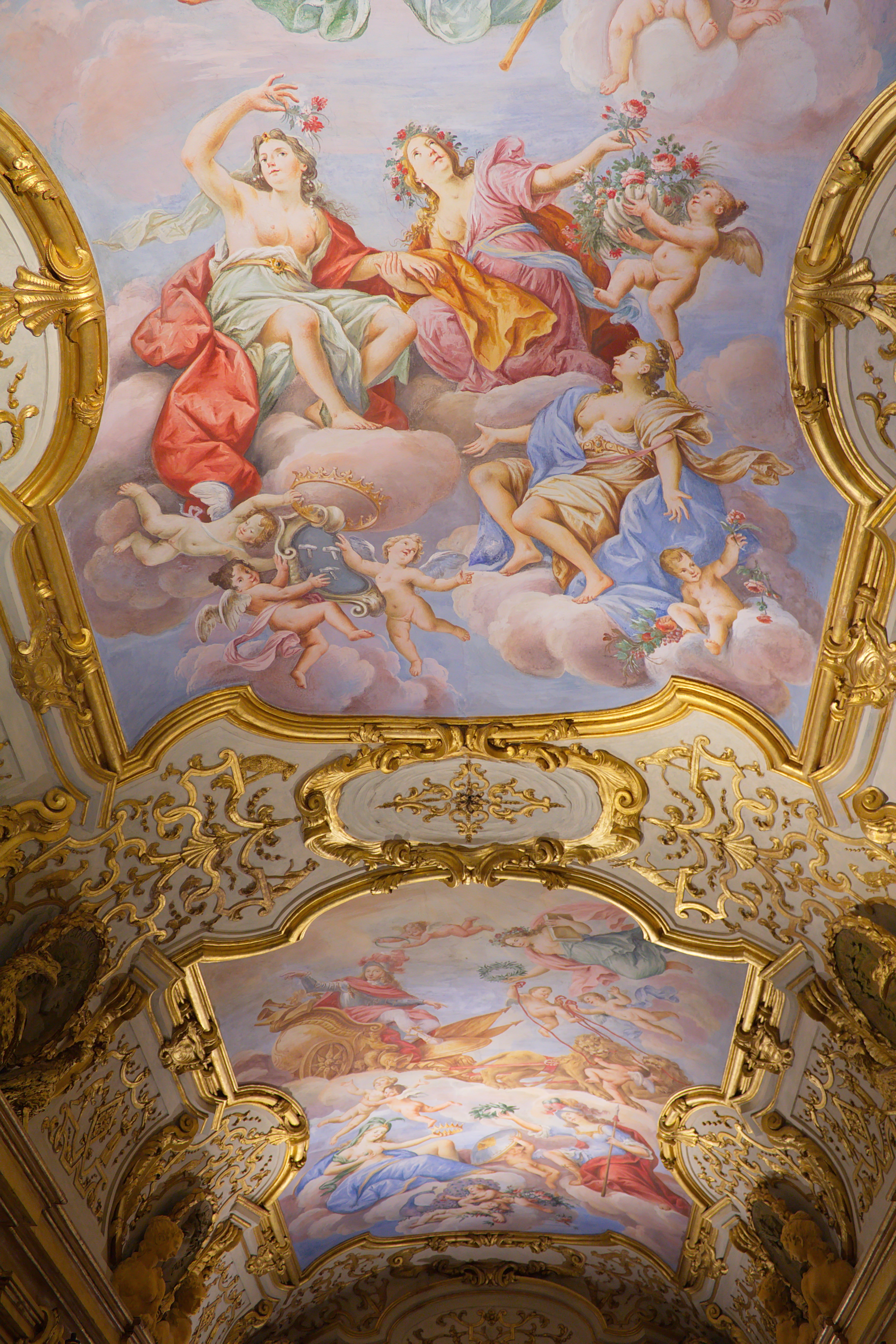
Mazzetti Gallery

Purchased by the Cassa di Risparmio di Asti in 1937, three years later it granted the Municipality permission to set up the Museum and Art Gallery there. Owned by the Cassa di Risparmio di Asti Foundation since 2001, it reopened to the public in December 2011, completely refurbished and restored.

== See also ==
- Casane Astigiane
- Michelangelo Pittatore
