= Fred (given name) =

Fred, sometimes spelled Fredd, is a masculine given name. It is often short for Frederick, Manfred, Alfred, or Wilfred.

== Mononym ==
- Fred (cartoonist) (1931–2013), pen name of French comics creator Fred Othon Aristidès
- Fred (footballer, born 1979), Helbert Frederico Carreiro da Silva, Brazilian footballer
- Fred (footballer, born 1983), Frederico Chaves Guedes, Brazilian footballer
- Fred (footballer, born 1986), Frederico Burgel Xavier, Brazilian footballer
- Fred (footballer, born 1993), Frederico Rodrigues de Paula Santos, Brazilian footballer
- Fred and Fred Again, stage names of British singer, songwriter, multi-instrumentalist, record producer, and remixer Frederick Gibson (born 1993)

== A ==
- Fred Aandahl (disambiguation)
- Fred Abbott (1874–1935), American baseball catcher
- Fred Abel (1903–1980), American football player
- Fred Abraham Jr. (1886–1918), British Guianese cricketer
- Fred Abraham Sr. (1859–?), British Guianese cricketer
- Fred Achelam (born 2001), Ugandan cricketer
- Fred Acorn (born 1961), American football defensive back
- Fred Adams (born 1961), American astrophysicist
- Fred Agabashian (1913–1989), American racer of midget cars and Indy cars
- Fred Agbedi, educationist and politician from Nigeria
- Fred Agius (born 1984), Australian footballer
- Fred Agnich (1913–2004), American geophysicist and politician
- Fred Ah Kuoi (born 1956), New Zealand rugby league player
- Fred Ahern (disambiguation)
- Fred Ainsworth (1894–1981), English footballer
- Fred Ajudua, Nigerian criminal accused of being an advance-fee fraud scammer
- Fred Akers (1938–2020), American football player and coach
- Fred Åkerström (1937–1985), Swedish folk guitarist and singer
- Fred Akshar, American Republican politician
- Fred Akuffo (1937–1979), Ghanaian soldier and politician
- Fred Albin (1902–1965), American sound engineer
- Fred Alder (1889–1960), Australian rules footballer
- Fred Alderman (1905–1998), American sprinter
- Fred Aldrich (1904–1979), American actor
- Fred Alexander (1880–1969), American tennis player
- Fred Alexander (disambiguation)
- Fred Allandale (1872–1921), British musical comedy actor, comedian, and producer
- Fred Allen (1894–1956), American comedian
- Fred Allen (disambiguation)
- Fred Alley (1962–2001), American musical theatre lyricist and librettist
- Fred Allison (1882–1974), American physicist
- Fred Alsop (born 1938), British long jumper
- Fred Anderson (disambiguation)
- Fred Andrade, Brazilian musician and composer
- Fred Andrews (disambiguation)
- Fred Andrus (1850–1937), American baseball outfielder and pitcher
- Fred Rufus Angevine (1889–1956), American attorney and politician
- Fred Anhalt (1896–1996), American architect
- Fred C. Anson (1933–2024), American electrochemist and academic
- Fred Anton (1934–2017), American businessman
- Fred Apostoli (1913–1973), American boxer
- Fred Appleby (1879–1956), British long-distance runner
- Fred Applegate (baseball) (1879–1968), American baseball pitcher
- Fred Applegate (actor) (born 1953), American actor, dancer, and singer
- Fred Appleyard (1874–1963), British landscape artist
- Fred Appleyard (footballer) (1909–1995), English footballer
- Fred Arbanas (1939–2021), American football player
- Fred Arbinger (born 1957), German footballer
- Fred Archer (disambiguation)
- Fred Armisen (born 1966), American actor, screenwriter, producer, director, and musician
- Fred Arthur (born 1961), Canadian ice hockey player
- Fred Ascani (1917–2010), United States Air Force major general and test pilot
- Fred Ashworth (fl.1907–?), English rugby league footballer
- Fred Astaire (1899–1987), American film and Broadway stage dancer
- Fredd Atkins (born 1952), American politician
- Fred Atkinson (educator) (fl.1900–1902), American Director of Education in the Philippines
- Fred Atkinson (footballer) (1919–1991), English footballer
- Fred Auckenthaler (1899–1946), Swiss ice hockey player
- Fred Avey (1909–1999), English footballer
- Fred Ayers (1912–1986), Australian rules footballer
- Fred C. Ainsworth (1852–1934), United States Army surgeon
- Fred M. Ahern (1884–1950), American lawyer and politician

== B ==
- Fred Bachrach (1914–2009), Dutch literary and art historian
- Fred Backway (1913–1995), Australian rules footballer
- Fred Bacon (fl.1890s), British runner
- Fred Baczewski (1926–1976), American baseball player
- Fred Baer (1932–2007), American football player
- Fred Bailey (baseball) (1895–1972), American baseball player
- Fred Baker (disambiguation)
- Fred Bakewell (1908–1983), English cricketer
- Fred Ball (1915–2007), American movie studio executive and actor
- Fred Ball (footballer) (1868–1902), Australian rules footballer
- Fred J. Balshofer (1877–1969), American silent film director, producer, screenwriter, and cinematographer
- Fred B. Balzar (1880–1934), American politician and Governor of Nevada
- Fred Bamford (1849–1934), Australian politician
- Fred Bamford (footballer) (1887–1955), Australian rules football player
- Fred Bankhead (1912–1972), American baseball player
- Fred Banks (born 1962), American football wide receiver
- Fred A. Bantz (1895–1982), American Department of Navy official
- Fred Barakat (1939–2010), American basketball coach
- Fred Barber (born 1963), English footballer
- Fred Bardshar (1915–1993), American World War II flying ace
- Fred Baring (1890–1961), Australian rules footballer
- Fred Barker (1901–1935), American bank robber
- Fred Barker (footballer) (1903–1974), Australian rules footballer
- Fred Barnard (1846–1896), English illustrator, caricaturist and genre painter
- Fred Barnes (disambiguation)
- Fred Barnett (born 1966), American football player
- Fred Barnett (born 1966), English professional footballer
- Fred Baron (disambiguation)
- Fred Barr (1882–1922), American trailblazer
- Fred Barratt (1894–1947), English cricketer
- Fred Barrett (disambiguation)
- Fred Barry (1948–2016), American football player
- Fred Bartram (1869–1948), New Zealand Member of Parliament
- Fred Basolo (1920–2007), American inorganic chemist
- Fred Bassetti (1917–2013), American architect
- Fred Bateman (1937–2012), economic historian
- Fred Baur (1918–2008), American chemist and food storage technician
- Fred Baxter (born 1971), American football player
- Fred Beckey (1923–2017), American mountaineer and rock climber
- Fred Berry (1951–2003), American actor
- Fred Beyeler (born 1965), New Zealand cricketer
- Fred Bosman (born 1944), Dutch pathologist
- Fred Bradshaw (born 1951), Canadian politician
- Fred C. Brannon (1901–1954), American film director
- Fred Brown (disambiguation)
- Fred Aghogho Brume (1942–2011), Nigerian politician
- Fred Brumm (1887–1946), American football player

== C ==
- Fred Carr (1946–2018), American football linebacker
- Fred Carreiro (born 1979), Brazilian footballer
- Fred Campos (born 1984), Brazilian footballer
- Fred Cheng (born 1983), Canadian-born Hong Kong musician and actor
- Fred Clark (disambiguation)
- Fred Clarke (disambiguation)
- Fred Coby (1916–1970), American actor
- Fred Cone (disambiguation)
- Fred Cook (disambiguation)
- Fred Curatolo (born 1958), Canadian freelance editorial cartoonist
- Fred Couples (born 1959), American golfer

== D ==
- Fred Davis (disambiguation)
- Fred De Bruyne (1930–1994), Belgian champion cyclist
- Fred De Palma (born 1989), Italian rapper
- Fred Dibnah (1938–2004), British steeplejack, industrial archaeologist, and broadcaster
- Fred Dinenage (born 1942), English newsreader and broadcaster
- Fred Durst, vocalist of Limp Bizkit

== E ==
- Fred Elder (fl. 1968–1976), race car owner
- Fred Elliott (disambiguation)
- Fred Ellis (disambiguation)

== F ==
- Fred Fisher (1875–1942), American songwriter
- Fred Fisher (disambiguation)
- Fred Ford (disambiguation)
- Fred A. Fredrich (1870–1954), American politician
- Fred Funk (born 1956), American golfer

== G ==
- Fred Gallagher (disambiguation)
- Fred Gause (1879–1944), justice of the Indiana Supreme Court
- Fred Gibson (disambiguation)
- Fred Glover (disambiguation)
- Fred Goetz (1897–1934), American mobster
- Fred Goldsmith (disambiguation)
- Fred Graham (disambiguation)
- Fred Gray (disambiguation)
- Fred Green (disambiguation)
- Fred Guttenberg (born 1965), American activist against gun violence

== H ==
- Fred Haise (born 1933), American aeronautical engineer, test pilot, and NASA astronaut
- Fred Harvey Harrington (1912–1995), American educator and university president
- Fred Harris (disambiguation)
- Fred Harrison (disambiguation)
- Fred Hartley (1905–1980), Scottish pianist, conductor, and composer
- Fred A. Hartley Jr. (1902–1969), American politician
- Fred Harvey (disambiguation)
- Fred A. Henderich (1879–1941), American architect
- Fred Hill (disambiguation)
- Fred Hilton (born 1948), American basketball player
- Fred Hoey (1885–1949), American baseball broadcaster
- Fred Hoey (baseball manager) (1865–1933), American baseball manager
- Fred Holliday (disambiguation)
- Fred Nall Hollis (born 1948), American artist
- Fred Hollows (1929–1993), Australian ophthalmologist and philanthropist
- Fred J. Homeyer (1913–1990), justice of the South Dakota Supreme Court
- Fred W. Hooper (1897–2000), American Thoroughbred racehorse owner and breeder
- Fred A. Howland (1864–1953), Vermont attorney, businessman, and politician
- Fred Hoyle (1915–2001), English astronomer
- Fred Hunt (disambiguation)

== J ==
- Fred Jackson (disambiguation)
- Fred Johnson (disambiguation)
- Frederick Jones (disambiguation)

== K ==
- Fred Karno (1866–1941), English theatre impresario of the British music hall
- Fred Kaplan (disambiguation)
- Fred Keller (disambiguation)
- Fred Kelly (disambiguation)
- Fred Kelsey (1884–1961), American actor, film director, and screenwriter
- Fred Kiprop (born 1974), Kenyan long-distance runner
- Fred J. Koenekamp (1922–2017), American cinematographer
- Fred Kohler (1888–1938), American actor
- Fred Krone (1930–2010), American actor and stuntman

== L ==
- Fred Lane (disambiguation)
- Fred Lawless, British playwright
- Fred Luddy (born 1954/1955), American billionaire founder of ServiceNow
- Fred Luter (born 1956), African-American president of the Southern Baptist Convention
- Fred Lyon (1924–2022), American photographer

== M ==
- Fred MacAulay (born 1956), Scottish comedian
- Fred H. Madden (born 1954), American politician
- Fred Matiang'i, Kenyan academic and secretary
- Fred Mavin (1884–1957), English footballer and manager
- Fred Meyer (disambiguation)
- Fred Miller (disambiguation)
- Fred Momotenko, Dutch composer Alfred Momotenko Levitsky (born 1970)
- Fred Moore (disambiguation)
- Fred Morris (disambiguation)
- Fred Morrison (born 1963), Scottish musician
- Fred Moseley (1913–1989), American ice hockey player
- Fred Moseley (economist) (1946), American economist
- Fred "Curly" Morrison (1926–2020), American football player
- Fred A. Mueller (1868–?), American politician
- Fred Mundee (1913–1990), American football player
- Fred Murphy (disambiguation)

== N ==
- Fred Naumetz (1922–1998), American footballer
- Fred Negro (born 1959), Australian satirist, musician, songwriter, and cartoonist
- Fred Negus (1923–2005), American footballer
- Fred Neher (1903–2001), American cartoonist
- Fred Neil (1936–2001), American singer-songwriter
- Fred Nesser (1887–1967), American football player
- Fred Neufeld (1869–1945), Polish physician
- Fred Neulander (born 1941–2024), American rabbi
- Fred Newhouse (born 1948), American sprinter
- Fred Newman (disambiguation)
- Fred Newton (disambiguation)
- Fred Niblo (1874–1948), American film actor, director, and producer
- Fred Niblo Jr. (1903–1973), American screenwriter
- Fred Nicholas (1893–1962), English cricketer
- Fred Nicholson (rugby union) (1885–?), Australian rugby union player
- Fred Nicholson (1894–1972), American baseball player
- Fred Nickson (1919–?), English footballer
- Fred Nicole (born 1970), Swiss rock climber
- Fred Nidd (1869–1956), English footballer
- Fred Nile (1934–2026), Australian politician
- Fred Nixon (Australian footballer) (1874–1933), Australian rules footballer
- Fred Nixon (born 1958), American wide receiver
- Fred Nøddelund (1947–2016), Norwegian jazz musician, music arranger, record producer, and bandleader
- Fred Nolting (1932–2016), American politician
- Fred Nomens (1869–1953), Australian rules footballer
- Fred Noonan (1893–1937), American flight navigator, sea captain, and aviation pioneer
- Fred Norcross (1884–1965), American footballer, coach, and mining engineer
- Fred Norman (baseball) (born 1942), American baseball player
- Fred Norman (musician) (1910–1993), American jazz composer, music arranger, trombonist, and singer
- Fred B. Norman (1882–1947), American politician
- Fred Norris (born 1955), American radio personality
- Fred Norton (1928–2000), American politician, speaker, and judge
- Fred Noseworthy (1871–1942), Canadian track and field athlete

== P ==
- Fred Penner (born 1946), Canadian children's music performer
- Fred Peters (politician) (1867–1935), Dutch-American politician and mayor of Murray, Utah
- Fred Peters (artist) (1923–2018), American comic book artist
- Fred Phelps (1929–2014), head of the controversial Westboro Baptist Church
- Fred Popovici (born 1948), Romanian composer

== R ==
- Fred Rice (1918–2005), American football coach
- Fred Robinson (disambiguation)
- Fred Rogers (1928–2003), American children's television show host
- Fred Rose (disambiguation)
- Fred Rosen (disambiguation)
- Frederico Rodrigues Santos (born 1993), Brazilian footballer

== S ==
- Fred Sanford (disambiguation)
- Fred Savage (born 1976), American actor and director
- Fred A. Seaton (1909–1974), American Secretary of the Interior
- Fred Jay Seaver (1877–1970), American mycologist
- Fred R. Shapiro (born 1954), American editor
- Fred Sherman (disambiguation)
- Fred Shields (disambiguation)
- Fred Sinowatz (1929–2008), Austrian politician
- Fred Slaughter (1942–2016), American basketball player and sports agent
- Fred Albert Shannon (1893–1963), American historian
- Fred Shook (1919–1992), American football player
- Fred Small (disambiguation)
- Fred Smith (disambiguation)
- Fred E. Soucy (1922–1993), Canadian politician
- Fred van der Spek (1923-2017), Dutch politician
- Fred Stafford (1926–2009), Australian rules footballer
- Fred Stoller (born 1958), American actor, stand-up comedian, and author
- Fred Stringer (fl.1914–1916), English football manager

== T ==
- Fred Taylor (disambiguation)
- Fred Tatasciore (born 1967), American voice actor
- Fred Thomas (disambiguation)
- Fred Thompson (1942–2015), American politician
- Fred Toones (1906–1962), African-American ctor
- Fred Tuttle (1919–2003), American farmer who ran, tongue in cheek, for the United States Senate

== V ==
- Fred Vail, American football, basketball, and baseball coach
- Fred Valentine (disambiguation)
- Fred VanVleet (born 1994), American basketball player
- Fred Vargas (born 1957), French historian, archaeologist, and novelist
- Fred Vaughan (1904–1986), American football player
- Fred Vaughn (1918–1964), American baseball player
- Fred Venturelli (1917–1990), American football player
- Fred Vinson (disambiguation)
- Fred Vulliamy (1913–1968), Canadian politician

== W ==
- Fred Waring (1900–1984), American popular musician, bandleader and radio-television personality
- Fred M. Warner (1865–1923), Governor of the U.S. state of Michigan
- Fred Warner (baseball) (1855–1886), American baseball player
- Fred Warner (American football) (born 1996), American football player
- Fred Waters (1927–1989), American baseball player
- Fred Waters (American football) (1878–1943), American football player
- Fredd Wayne (1924–2018), American actor
- Fred Weber (singer), vocalist for the new wave band Devo
- Fred Webster (disambiguation)
- Fred West (1941–1995), British serial killer
- Fred White (1955–2023), American drummer and a member of the Earth, Wind & Fire
- Fred Wilcox (disambiguation)
- Fred Williams (disambiguation)
- Fred Wilson (disambiguation)
- Fred Wise (disambiguation)
- Fred Wolf (disambiguation)
- Fred Wright (disambiguation)

== Y ==
- Fredd Young (born 1961), American football player

== Z ==
- Fred Zarr (born 1955), American musician
- Fred Zinnemann (1907–1997), Austrian-American film director, producer, and screenwriter

== Fictional characters ==
- Fred Basset, a comic book dog
- Fred Claus, title character in the film Fred Claus
- Fred Elliott, in the soap opera Coronation Street
- Fred Figglehorn, a YouTube character created and portrayed by Lucas Cruikshank
- Fred Finely, in Ninjago
- Fred Flintstone, main character of the animated sitcom The Flintstones
- Fred Fonseca, in the soap opera EastEnders
- Fred Fredburger, in the animated TV series Billy and Mandy
- Fred Jones (Scooby-Doo), a supporting character from the animated series Scooby-Doo
- Fred Kwon, highest paid member of the Surprise Party
- Fred Leblanc, a main character in the animated series Fred's Head
- Fred Mertz, a main character in the sitcom I Love Lucy
- Fred the Octopus, in Pocoyo
- Fred Peterson, in the American sitcom Get a Life (1990–1992)
- Fred G. Sanford, main character in the sitcoms Sanford and Son and Sanford
- Fred Weasley, in the Harry Potter series
- Coconut Fred, title character of the animated series Coconut Fred's Fruit Salad Island
- Drop Dead Fred, title character of the '91 black comedy cult film Drop Dead Fred
- Freaky Fred, from the animated series Courage the Cowardly Dog
- Fred, eponymous character of Ferry Boat Fred
- Fred, in the 2021 Canadian-American movie Mister Sister
- Fred, in the American sitcom Roseanne
- Fred, in the films Cars and Cars 2
- Fred, in the indie game Them's Fightin' Herds
- Fred, in The Muppet Christmas Carol
- Fred the Admin, a deceased character from season 2 of the video game Minecraft: Story Mode
- Fred, the Undercover Kitten
- Fred, a squirrel in The Penguins of Madagascar

== See also ==
- Fred (disambiguation)
- Alfred (name)
- Federico
- Ffred Ffransis (born 1948), Welsh activist and linguist
- Freddy (given name)
- Frédéric
- Frederick (given name)
- Frederico
- Fredrik
- Fredro
- Friedrich (given name)
- Fryderyk (given name)
