= Fred Atkinson =

Fred Atkinson may refer to:

- Fred Atkinson (educator) (1865–1941), American educator and administrator
- Fred Atkinson (footballer) (1919–1991), English footballer
- Fred Atkinson (1910–1988), known by his ring name Fred Atkins, New Zealand-born Canadian professional wrestler

== See also ==
- Sir Frederick Atkinson (1919–2018), British civil servant
- Frederick Valentine Atkinson (1916–2002), British mathematician
