= Frederic J. Brown =

Frederic J. Brown may refer to:

- Frederic J. Brown II (1905–1971), U.S. Army lieutenant general and father of Frederic J. Smith III
- Frederic J. Brown III (1934–2024), U.S. Army lieutenant general and son of Frederic J. Smith II
