= Frederick Hunt =

Frederick Hunt may refer to:

- Frederick Hunt (cricketer) (1875–1967), English cricketer
- Jack Hunt (RAF officer) (Frederick John Hunt, 1899–1954), English World War I flying ace
- Frederick Vinton Hunt (1905–1972), inventor, scientist and acoustic engineering professor at Harvard University
- Frederick Seager Hunt (1837–1904), British Conservative Party politician and distiller
- Frederick Knight Hunt (1814–1854), English journalist and author

== See also ==
- Fred Hunt (disambiguation)
