= Fred Brown =

Frederick, Frederic, Fred, Freddy or Freddie Brown may refer to:

== Artists and musicians ==
- Freddie Brown (musician) (1940–2002), American New Mexico musician
- Frederick Brown (artist) (1851–1941), British artist and founder member of the New English Art Club
- Frederick J. Brown (1945–2012), American painter of musicians

== Politicians ==
- Fred Brown (Alaska politician) (1943–2014), American lawyer and politician, member of the Alaska House of Representatives 1975–1983
- Fred Brown (Texas politician), Republican member of the Texas House of Representatives
- Fred H. Brown (1879–1955), United States congressman from New Hampshire
- Frederick P. Brown (1838–1925), Norwegian-American sailor, farmer, and politician in Minnesota

== Sports ==
=== American football ===
- Fred Brown (American football guard) (1905–1979)
- Fred Brown (linebacker) (born 1943)
- Fred Brown (wide receiver) (born 1993), American football player

=== Association football ===
- Fred Brown (footballer, born 1895) (1895–1960), English football inside forward
- Fred Brown (footballer, born 1931) (1931–2013), English football goalkeeper
- Freddie Brown (footballer) (1878–1939), English football forward

=== Rugby ===
- Fred Brown (rugby league, Wales), Welsh rugby league footballer of the 1920s
- Fred Brown (rugby league, Sydney), Australian rugby player of the 1940s
- Fred Brown (rugby league, born 1926) (1926–2016), Australian rugby league player

=== Other sports ===
- Fred Brown (Australian footballer) (1896–1971), Australian rules footballer
- Fred H. Brown (1879–1955), American baseball player and politician
- Fred Brown (basketball) (born 1948), American former basketball player
- Fred Brown (ice hockey) (1900–1970), Canadian ice hockey player
- Freddie Brown (cricketer) (1910–1991), Peruvian-born English cricketer and cricket commentator

== Other ==
- Fred Brown (virologist) (1925–2004), British virologist and molecular biologist
- Frederick Brown (editor) (born 1934), professor, author, editor and translator of French literature, see Bollingen Foundation
- Frederick Brown (sound editor) (1935–2003), American sound editor
- Frederick Elliott Brown (1895–1971), Canadian World War I flying ace credited with 10 aerial victories
- Fredric Brown (1906–1972), American science fiction and mystery author
- Frederic J. Brown II (1905–1971), United States Army officer
- Frederic J. Brown III (1934–2024), United States Army officer
