= Fred Hill =

Fred, Freddie, Frederic, or Frederick Hill may refer to:

== Sports ==
- Fred Hill (rugby league) (fl. 1909), English rugby league footballer
- Fred Hill (baseball) (1900–?), American baseball player
- Freddie Hill (footballer, born 1914), Welsh footballer
- Fred Hill (Australian footballer) (1927–2020), Australian rules footballer
- Fred Hill (coach) (1934–2019), American college baseball coach
- Fred Hill (footballer, born 1940) (1940–2021), English footballer
- Fred Hill (American football) (born 1943), American football player
- Fred Hill (basketball) (born 1959), American college basketball coach
- Frederick Hill (cricketer) (1847–1913), English cricketer and clergyman

== Others ==
- Frederick Hill (musician) (fl. 1795), of Loughborough, York, and Elmfield College
- Frederick Hill (politician) (fl. 1874) Florida state legislator
- Fred Hill (activist) (1909–1984), British activist who protested against the compulsory wearing of crash helmets on motorcycles
- Frederick William Hill (1889–1959), British military engineer
- Frederic William Hill (1866–1954), Canadian lawyer and military officer
- Frederic Hill (prison inspector) (1803–1896), British prison inspector, and social and economic reformer

== See also ==
- Hill (surname)
