= Frederick Barker =

Frederick Barker may refer to:

- Frederic Barker (1808–1882), bishop of Sydney
- Frederick Eustace Barker (1838–1915), Canadian lawyer, judge and politician
- Fred Barker (1901–1935), American criminal
- Fred Barker (footballer) (1903–1974), Australian rules footballer
