= Fred Newman =

Fred or Frederick Newman may refer to:

- Fred Newman (actor) (born 1952), American actor
- Fred Newman (baseball) (1942–1987), American baseball player
- Fred Newman (businessman) (1916–2012), British shipbroking and aviation entrepreneur
- Fred Newman (philosopher) (1935–2011), American philosopher and psychotherapist
- Frederick Newman (English cricketer) (1896–1966), English cricketer
- Frederick Newman (Australian cricketer) (1909–1977), Australian cricketer
- Frederick S. Newman (1847-1906), American architect
