= Fred Moore =

Fred Moore may refer to:

- Fred R. Moore (1857–1943), American editor and publisher
- Fred Moore (attorney) (1882–1933), American defense attorney in the Sacco and Vanzetti case
- Fred Moore (Australian footballer) (1890–1971), Australian rules football player
- Fred Moore (English footballer) (fl. 1927), English footballer for Bradford City
- Fred Moore (animator) (1911–1952), American animator who worked for Disney
- Fred Moore (politician) (1920–2017), French soldier, politician, and optician
- Fred Kenneth Moore (1921–1941), American Navy Cross recipient after whom the destroyer USS Moore was named
- Fred Moore (Australian activist) (1922–2022), Australian workers' and human rights activist and author
- Fred Moore (American soldier) (born 1936), first African-American tomb guard for the Tomb of the Unknown Soldier
- Fred Moore (activist) (1942–1997), American activist involved in early PC history
- Fred Moore (boxer) (born 1967), light heavyweight boxer from Minnesota

== See also ==
- Freddy Moore (1950–2022), American singer-songwriter
- Freddie Moore (1900–1992), American jazz drummer, washboarder, and singer
- Frederic Moore (1830–1907), British entomologist
- Frederic Moore (sport shooter) (1851–1926), British sport shooter
- Frederick Moore (disambiguation)
