= Lichen ruber =

Lichen ruber is one of several diseases of the skin:

- Lichen ruber moniliformis (Wise–Rein disease)
- Lichen ruber planus (lichen planus)
