= Frederick Ford =

Frederick Ford may refer to:

- Frederick John Ford, Anglican priest
- Frederick W. Ford (1909–1986), chairman of the Federal Communications Commission (1960–1961)

== See also ==
- Fred Ford (disambiguation)
