= Frederick Baker (disambiguation) =

Frederick or Fred Baker may refer to:

- Frederick Baker (1965–2020), Austrian-British filmmaker and film producer
- Frederick Baker, convicted of, and executed for, the murder of Fanny Adams (1859–1867)
- Fred Baker (physician) (1854–1938), American physician, malacologist, founder of the Scripps Institution of Oceanography
- Fred Baker (soldier) (1908–1958), New Zealand army officer
- Fred Baker (engineer) (1952–2025), American engineer
- Fred Baker (architect) (1874–1936), English architect
- Frederick Baker (cricketer) (1851–1939), Australian cricketer
- Frederick Francis Baker (1772–1830), fellow of the Royal Society
- Frederick R. Baker (c. 1844–1906), American farmer, soldier, and politician
- Fred Thelonious Baker (born 1960), English musician
- Fred L. Baker (1872–1927), industrialist, shipbuilder and member of the Los Angeles City Council
- Frederick Baker (1850–1888), English opera singer whose stage name was Frederick Federici
- Frédéric De Backer, Belgian DJ and producer, former member of Y-Traxx

== See also ==
- Henry F. Baker (1866–1956), British mathematician
- Frederick Arnold-Baker (1885–1963), British lawyer
