= Frederick Robinson =

Frederick Robinson may refer to:

- Sir Frederick Philipse Robinson (1763–1852), soldier
- F. J. Robinson, 1st Viscount Goderich (Frederick John Robinson, 1782–1859), politician
- Frederick Oliver Robinson, 2nd Marquess of Ripon (1852–1923), Liberal politician
- Frederick Robinson (1746–1792), English MP
- Frederick Robinson (Royal Navy officer) (1836–1896), British Admiral
- Frederick Robinson (Wisconsin pharmacist) (1824–1893), Wisconsin state assemblyman
- Frederick B. Robinson (1883–1941), academic
- Frederick Robinson (Massachusetts politician) (1799–1882), Massachusetts politician
- Frederick Cayley Robinson (1862–1927), English painter, decorator and illustrator
- Frederick Oliver Robinson (1903–1969), Ontario machinist and political figure
- Frederick Walter Robinson (1888–1971), Australian academic at the University of Queensland
- Frederick William Robinson (1830–1901), English novelist

== See also ==
- Fred Robinson (disambiguation)
