= Friedrich Keller =

Friedrich Keller may refer to:

- Friedrich Ludwig Keller (1799–1860), Swiss-German jurist
- Friedrich Gottlob Keller (1816–1895), German machinist and inventor of the wood pulping process for papermaking
- Fritz Keller (1913–1985), German-born French footballer

== See also ==
- Friedrich von Keller (disambiguation)
- Fred Keller (disambiguation)
