= Fred Wright =

Fred or Frederick Wright may refer to:

- Fred Wright (cartoonist) (1907–1984), American labor cartoonist and activist
- Fred Wright (historian) (born 1947), British historian and theologian
- Frederick Wright (politician) (born 1933), Progressive Conservative party member of the House of Commons of Canada
- Frederick Eugene Wright (1877–1953), American optician and geophysicist
- Frederick Adam Wright (1869–1946), English classical scholar
- Frederick Wright (cricketer) (1855–1929), English cricketer
- Fred Wright (researcher), American engineer
- Fred Wright (cyclist) (born 1999), British racing cyclist
- Fred E. Wright (director) (1868–1936), American actor and director
- Fred Howard Wright (1896–1990), American songwriter, vaudeville performer, and character actor
