= Fred Harris =

Fred, Fredric, Fredrick, Frederic, or Frederick Harris may refer to:

== Arts and entertainment ==
- Fred Harris (presenter) (born 1947), British comedian and television presenter
- Frederick Harris (conductor) (fl. 2000s–present), American conductor
- Frederick Harris (painter), painted The Red Door, a watercolor of the Temple of Literature, Hanoi

== Politics and law ==
- Frederick Rutherfoord Harris (1856–1920), British politician, MP for Monmouth Boroughs and Dulwich
- Leverton Harris (Frederick Leverton Harris, 1864–1926), British politician, MP for Tynemouth, Stepney, and East Worcestershire
- Fred Harris (lawyer) (1910–1979), American politician, judge and painter
- Fred Harris (British politician) (1915–1979), British businessman and politician
- Fred R. Harris (1930–2024), American senator and presidential candidate

== Sports ==
- Smokey Harris (Fred Thomas Wilfred Harris, 1890–1974), Canadian ice hockey player
- Fred Harris (footballer, born 1912) (1912–1998), English footballer for Birmingham City
- Fred Harris (rugby league) (1909–1980), English rugby league footballer for England, Leigh, and Leeds
- Frederick Harris (cricketer) (1934–2024), English cricketer
- Fred Harris (Australian footballer) (1937–2019), Australian rules footballer
- Frederick Harris (judoka) (born 1984), Olympic judoka from Sierra Leone

== Others ==
- Frederic R. Harris (1875–1949), American philatelist
- Frederick Brown Harris (1883–1970), American Methodist clergyman
- Frederick John Harris (1937–1965), South African schoolteacher and anti-apartheid campaigner
- Fredric J. Harris (born 1940), American professor of electrical engineering and signal processing
- Fredrick C. Harris, American political scientist

== Other uses ==
- Frederick Harris Music, Canadian music publishing firm
