= Frederick Harris Music =

The Frederick Harris Music Co., Limited (Frederick Harris Music) is a music publishing firm in Toronto, Ontario, Canada, founded in 1904. The company claims to be the oldest music publishing company in Canada, and has supported the work of composers including Boris Berlin, Sir Ernest MacMillan, and Healey Willan. In addition to repertoire for piano, guitar, violin, flute and voice, the Frederick Harris Music catalogue also includes publications for ear training, sight reading, technique, theory, harmony, and music history.

== Frederick Harris ==
Frederick Harris (1866–1945) began his music publishing career in England working for a large music publishing firm. In 1904, he set up his own business in London and in 1910, established a Canadian office in Toronto. Harris' association with the Royal Conservatory of Music resulted in an increased emphasis on publications for teaching and learning.

== Publications ==
The music examination system in Canada is supported by teaching materials published by the company. These include:

- Celebration Series, Perspectives
- Voice Series
- Bridges: A Comprehensive Guitar Series
- Violin Series
- Overtones: A Comprehensive Flute Series

Other notable publications include:

- Four Star: Sight Reading and Ear Tests by Boris Berlin, series editor Scott McBride Smith
- Celebrate Piano! by Cathy Albergo, J. Mitzi Kolar, and Mark Mrozinski
- Sound Advice: Theory and Ear Training by Brenda Braaten and Crystal Wiksyk
- Christopher Norton Connections for Piano by Christopher Norton
- Composer Editions compiled by Reid Alexander, Samuel S. Holland, and Marc Widner, edited by Andrew Hisey
