= Fred Robinson =

Fred Robinson may refer to:

== Sports ==
=== Association football (soccer) ===
- Fred Robinson (footballer, born 1881) (1881–?), English footballer for Grimsby Town
- Fred Robinson (footballer, born 1884) (1884–1971), Australian rules footballer for Essendon
- Fred Robinson (footballer, born 1939) (1939–2000), Australian rules footballer for North Melbourne & Brunswick
- Fred Robinson (footballer, born 1954), English footballer for Doncaster Rovers and Huddersfield Town

=== Other sports ===
- Fred Robinson (baseball) (1856–1933), American baseball second baseman
- Fred Robinson (rugby league) (fl. 1930s–1940s), Australian rugby player
- Fred Robinson (Canadian football) (born 1930), Canadian football player
- Fred Robinson (American football) (born 1961), American football linebacker

== Others ==
- Fred Norris Robinson (1871–1966), American Celticist and scholar of Geoffrey Chaucer
- Fred Robinson (musician) (1901–1984), American trombonist
- Fred Shuttlesworth (born Fred Lee Robinson, 1922–2011), American civil rights activist
- Fred C. Robinson (1930–2016), American academic
- Abu Talib (musician) (born Fred Leroy Robinson, 1939–2009), American blues and jazz musician
- Fred D. Robinson Jr. (fl. 1976–2009), U.S. Army general; recipient of several service medals

== See also ==
- Frederick Robinson (disambiguation)
- Freddie Robinson (American football) (born 1964), American football player
