= Frederick Murphy =

Frederick Murphy may refer to:

- F. A. Murphy, virologist associated with rabies and Ebola
- Frederick C. Murphy (1918–1945), Medal of Honor recipient
- Frederick V. Murphy (1879–1958), American architect and architectural educator
- Frederick E. Murphy (1872–1940), American businessman

== See also ==
- Frederic Timothy Murphy (1884–1924), American World War I soldier
- Fred Murphy (disambiguation)
