= Friedrich von Keller =

Friedrich von Keller may refer to:

- Friedrich von Keller (painter) (1840–1914), German genre painter
- Friedrich von Keller (diplomat) (1873–1960), German diplomat

== See also ==
- Friedrich Keller (disambiguation)
