= Fred Kelly =

Fred or Frederic(k) Kelly may refer to:

- Frederic Festus Kelly (died 1883), founder of Kelly's Directories, Ltd.
- Fred Kelly (footballer) (1877–?), Welsh footballer
- Frederick Septimus Kelly (1881–1916), Australian and British musician, composer and rower
- Fred C. Kelly (1882–1959), American humorist, newspaperman, columnist and author
- Fred Kelly (ice hockey) (1887/1888–1974), Canadian amateur and professional ice hockey player
- J. Frederick Kelly (1888–1947), American architect
- Fred Kelly (hurdler) (1891–1974), American track and field hurdler
- Fred Norbert Kelly (1916–2000), American choreographer, dancer, actor and director
- Fred Kelly (comics) (1921–2005), Canadian creator of comic books during the 1940s
- Fred Kelly (cross-country skier) (born 1952), Canadian former cross-country skier
