= Kaposi's disease =

Kaposi's disease can refer to:

- Kaposi's sarcoma
- Lichen ruber moniliformis
