= Fred Valentine =

Fred Valentine may refer to:

- Fred Valentine (footballer, born 1880) (1880–?), English footballer
- Fred Valentine (footballer, born 1909) (1909–1981), English footballer
- Fred Valentine (baseball) (1935–2022), American baseball player
