= Frederick Newton (disambiguation) =

Frederick Newton (1951–1986) was executed for organising an attempted coup in Dominica.

Frederick Newton, or variants, may also refer to:

- Frederick Newton (cricketer) (Frederick Arthur Newton, 1890–1924), English cricketer
- Frederic Newton (1870–1959), politician in Manitoba, Canada
- Frederick Robert Newton (1841–1926), Anglican minister and schoolmaster
- Fred Newton (rugby union) (Frederick Newton, 1881–1955), New Zealand rugby union player
- Fred Newton (politician) (Harold Francis Newton, 1921–1990), Queensland politician
- Fred Newton (swimmer) (1903-1992), American swimmer
