= Bo Rotoloni =

- Education: Clemson University (BS, MS)
- Known for: Information security research
- Scientific career
- Workplaces: Georgia Tech Research Institute

Bo Rotoloni is the deputy director of the Information & Cyber Sciences research and development directorate at the Georgia Tech Research Institute (GTRI). He is also the former director of GTRI Cyber Technology and Information Security Laboratory, a position he held from the creation of the laboratory in 2010 until accepting his current position in 2014. Rotoloni joined GTRI in 2004 and has also served as deputy director of the Signature Technology Laboratory (now the Advanced Concepts Laboratory).
