= Fred Wise =

Fred Wise may refer to:

- Fred Wise (physician) (1881–1950), American dermatologist
- Fred Wise (songwriter) (1915–1966), American lyricist who wrote songs for Elvis Presley

== See also ==
- Frederick Wise, 1st Baron Wise (1887–1968), British Labour Party politician
- Fredric Wise (1871–1928), British Conservative Party politician
