= Frederick Moore =

Frederick Moore may refer to:

- Frederick Moore (Lancashire cricketer) (1931–2016), English cricketer
- Frederick Moore (Cambridge University cricketer) (1873–1947), English schoolmaster and cricketer
- Frederick Moore (politician), Republican member of the Montana legislature
- Frederick T. Moore Jr. (1914–1969), United States Navy captain
- Frederick Ferdinand Moore (1881–1947), American pulp fiction writer
- Frederick William Moore, keeper of the Royal Botanical Gardens, Dublin

== See also ==
- Frederic Moore (1830–1907), British entomologist
- Fredrick Moore (born 2005), American football player
- Fred Moore (disambiguation)
