= Fred Lane =

Fred Lane may refer to:

- Fred Lane (American football) (1975–2000), Carolina Panthers running back
- Fred Lane (jockey) (1892–1979), winner of the 1932 Epsom Derby
- Fred Lane (rugby league) (1919–1977), Australian rugby league player
- Reverend Fred Lane, stage name of T.R. Reed
- Frederick Lane (1880–1969), Australian swimmer
- Frederic C. Lane (1900–1984), actor
