= Frederick Jackson =

Frederick Jackson or variants may refer to:

- Frederick Dorville Jackson (1859–1878), English coffee planter and tennis player
- Frederick George Jackson (1860–1938), British arctic explorer
- Frederick H. Jackson (Rhode Island politician) (1847–1915), lieutenant governor of Rhode Island 1905–1908
- Frederick Hamilton Jackson (1848–1923), painter
- Frederick Henry Jackson (1938–2003), Canadian politician
- Frederick Huth Jackson (1863–1921), British banker
- Frederick J. Jackson (1886–1953), American screenwriter
- Frederick John Jackson (1860–1929), English naturalist and colonial administrator
- Frederick R. Jackson (Frederick Randolph Jackson, 1844–1925), American soldier and recipient of the Medal of Honor
- Frederick Stanley Jackson (Ivor Thomas Gape, 1877–1957), British-New Zealand rugby player
- Fred Jackson (American football coach) (born 1950), University of Michigan assistant football coach
- Fred Jackson (running back) (Frederick George Jackson, born 1981), American football running back
- Fred Jackson (saxophonist) (born 1929), American R&B and jazz musician
- Fred Jackson Jr. (fl. from 1971), American jazz musician
- Fred S. Jackson (Fred Schuyler Jackson, 1868–1931), American lawyer and politician from Kansas
- Freddie Jackson (Frederick Anthony Jackson, 1956–2026), American R&B singer
- Fredric Jackson (1907–1990), Anglican bishop
- Freddrick Jackson (born 2004), American serial killer
