= Fred Keller =

Fred or Frederick Keller may refer to:

- Fred S. Keller (1899–1996), American pioneer in experimental psychology
- Fred Keller (politician) (born 1965), American politician from Pennsylvania
- Frederick King Keller (1950–2026), American director, producer and screenwriter

== See also ==
- Friedrich Keller (disambiguation)
- Fred Kelly (disambiguation)
