= Fred Webster =

Fred Webster may refer to:

- Fred Webster (Australian footballer) (1935–2012), played for Melbourne and Sandringham
- Fred Webster (boxer) (1908–1971), British boxer
- Fred Webster (English footballer) (1887–?), English footballer
- Fred Webster (rugby league) (1882–?), England and Great Britain international
- Frederick Webster (1885–1938), English cricketer
- Fred Webster (cricketer, born 1897) (1897–1931), English cricketer
- Freddie Webster (1917–1947), American jazz trumpeter
