= Fred Harvey =

Fred Harvey may refer to:

- Fred Harvey (entrepreneur) (1835–1901), entrepreneur, founder of the Fred Harvey Company
- Frederick Maurice Watson Harvey (1888–1980), rugby player and military officer
- F. W. Harvey (1888–1957), poet
- Buster Harvey (Frederick John Charles Harvey, 1950–2007), Canadian ice hockey player
- Frederick E. B. Harvey, 19th-century British diplomat
- Fred Harvey (politician) (born 1942), Canadian politician
- Fred Harvey Company, a chain of restaurants and hotels alongside railroads in the western United States

== See also ==
- Alfred Harvey (1913–1994), founder of comic book publisher Harvey Comics
