= Fred Holliday =

Fred or Frederick Holliday may refer to:

- Frederick W. M. Holliday (1828–1899), governor of Virginia
- Fred Holliday (marine biologist) (1935–2016), marine biologist, academic, and businessman
- Fred Parkinson Holliday (1888–1980), Australian flying ace
- Fred Grossinger (1936–1995), American actor known as Fred Holliday
- Frederick D. Holliday (1927–1985), American educator and Public School Superintendent

== See also ==
- Fredrick William Holiday (1921–1979), English journalist, angler, cryptozoologist and wildlife specialist
