= Fred Murphy =

Fred Murphy may refer to:

- Fred Murphy (cinematographer) (born 1942), American cinematographer
- Fred J. Murphy (1886–1956), American football player, coach of football, basketball, and baseball, and college athletics administrator
- Fred T. Murphy (1872–1948), American football player, physician
- Fred W. Murphy (1877–1937), American football player, coach, official
- Fred Murphy (American football player) (1938–2001), former player in the National Football League
- Fred Murphy (wrestler) (1924–1983), Australian Olympic wrestler
- Fred Murphy (ice hockey) (1896–1975), Irish-born Canadian ice hockey player

== See also ==
- Frederick Murphy (disambiguation)
