= Frederick Hunt (cricketer) =

English cricketer

Personal information
- Full name: Frederick Hunt
- Born: 13 September 1875; Aldworth, Berkshire
- Died: 31 March 1967 (aged 91); Worcester, Worcestershire
- Batting: Right-handed
- Bowling: Right-arm medium

Domestic team information
- Years: Team
- 1895–1896: Worcestershire
- 1897–1898: Kent
- 1900–1922: Worcestershire
- FC debut: 27 May 1897 Kent v Gloucestershire
- Last FC: 3 June 1922 Worcestershire v Essex

Career statistics
Competition	First-class
Matches	59
Runs scored	806
Batting average	10.60
100s/50s	0/0
Top score	40*
Balls bowled	3,089
Wickets	51
Bowling average	32.05
5 wickets in innings	0
10 wickets in match	0
Best bowling	4/36
Catches/stumpings	17/–
- Source: Cricinfo, 16 November 2017

Frederick Hunt (13 September 1875 – 31 March 1967) was an English professional cricketer who played first-class cricket for Kent County Cricket Club in 1897 and 1898, and for Worcestershire County Cricket Club between 1900 and 1922.

Hunt was born at Aldworth in Berkshire in 1875, the son of a wheelwright. He played Minor Counties Championship cricket for Worcestershire in 1895 and 1896 before moving to Canterbury to take up an appointment as the professional at St Lawrence Cricket Club. He impressed and was engaged by Kent ahead of the 1897 season. He made his first-class debut for Kent against Gloucestershire at Maidstone in May and played six times for the county, five in 1897 and once in 1898 during which he was employed at Kent's Tonbridge Nursery.

He returned to take up the post of professional and groundsman at Worcester ahead of Worcestershire's promotion to first-class county status in 1899. He did not play in 1899, making his Worcestershire first-class debut the following season before going on to play a total of 53 times for the county between then and 1922. He rarely made more than a handful of appearances in any season – only in 1908, when he played 14 matches did he make more than ten appearances. He played only six matches when cricket resumed after the First World War and his final appearance came in June 1922 against Essex at Leyton.

Hunt remained as the groundsman at New Road, serving almost 50 years in the role. His pitches were much respected and he had the reputation of being an excellent groundskeeper. He stood as an umpire in one first-class game at Worcester in 1919. He died at Worcester in 1967 aged 91.

== Bibliography ==
- Carlaw, Derek (2020). Kent County Cricketers, A to Z: Part One (1806–1914) (PDF). Cardiff: ACS.
