= Fred Hill (Australian footballer) =

Australian rules footballer (1927–2020)

Personal information
- Full name: Fred Hill
- Born: 13 May 1927
- Died: 27 May 2020 (aged 93)
- Original team: Coburg
- Height: 183 cm (6 ft 0 in)
- Weight: 83 kg (183 lb)

Playing career^{1}
Years	Club	Games (Goals)
1947	North Melbourne	2 (0)
- ^{1} Playing statistics correct to the end of 1947.

Fred Hill (13 May 1927 – 27 May 2020) was an Australian rules footballer who played with North Melbourne in the Victorian Football League (VFL).
