= Frederick John Ford =

Anglican priest

Frederick John Ford was an Anglican priest in the twentieth century.

Ford was ordained deacon in 1949, and priest in 1950. After a curacy in Blenheim he held incumbencies at Collingwood, Murchison and Awatere. He was Archdeacon of Marlborough from 1971 until 1984; and Archdeacon of Waimea from 1966 until 1971.
