= Fred Graham =

Fred or Frederick Graham may refer to:

== Public officials ==
- Sir Frederick Graham, 3rd Baronet (1820–1888), British diplomat
- Sir Frederick Fergus Graham 1893–1978), British politician
- Fred Graham (politician) (1899–1996), Australian member of Queensland Legislative Assembly
- Frederick Graham (British Army officer) (1908–1988), Lord Lieutenant of Stirling and Falkirk

== Others ==
- Fred Graham (American football) (1900–1952), 1926 NFL Championship winner
- Fred Graham (actor) (1908–1979), American stuntman
- Fred Graham (sculptor) (1928–2025), New Zealand artist and educator
- Fred Graham (correspondent) (1931–2019), American lawyer, anchor and managing editor of Court TV
