= Fred C. Kelly =

American journalist

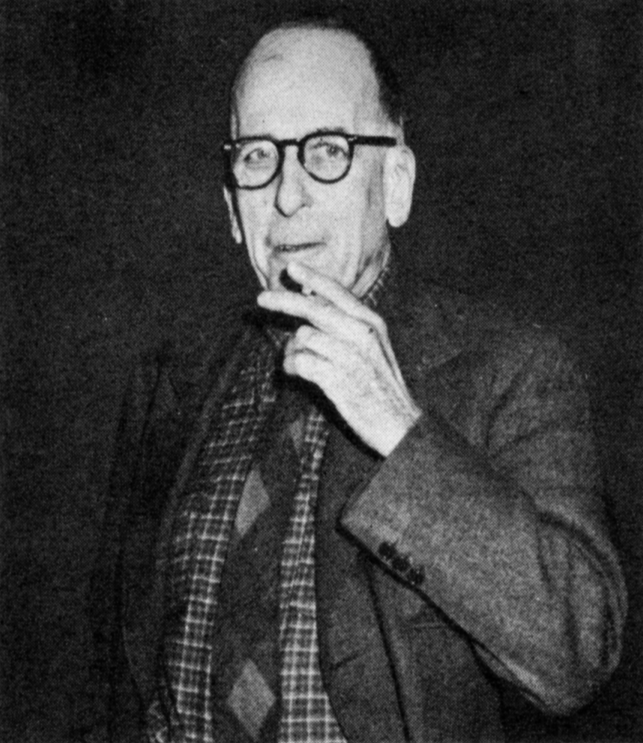
Author Fred C. Kelly, circa 1952, from the book jacket of "Kin Hubbard."

Fred Charters Kelly (1882–1959) was an American humorist, newspaperman, columnist and author.

Kelly was born in 1882 in Xenia, Ohio and studied at the University of Michigan (1900–1902). He began his newspaper career in 1896 as a local correspondent for a small town newspaper and wrote a humor column for The Plain Dealer (Cleveland, Ohio) for five years. His "Statesmen, Real and Near" column (1910–1918) was the first Washington, D.C. news column to be syndicated. During World War I, Kelly served briefly as special agent for the Federal Bureau of Investigation.

After the war Kelly bought and operated a farm in Peninsula, Ohio where he continued to support himself as a free-lance writer. In addition to his journalistic work, he was the official biographer of the Wright brothers, and worked to bring the original 1903 Wright Flyer home to the U.S. from the Science Museum in London, to which Orville Wright lent it during his long feud with the Smithsonian Institution over credit for the first flight.

== Bibliography ==
- Human Nature in Business (1920)
- The Fun of Knowing Folks (1923)
- "Seventy-Five Years of Hibbard Hardware the Story of Hibbard, Spencer, Bartlett & Co." (1930)
- How to Lose Your Money Prudently (1933)
- They Wouldn't Believe the Wrights had Flown: A Study in Human Incredulity (1940)
- The Wright Brothers (1943)
- David Ross - Modern Pioneer (1946)
- George Ade - Warm Hearted Satirist (1947)
- Miracle at Kitty Hawk: The Letters of Wilbur and Orville Wright (1951) (editor)
- The Life and Times of Kin Hubbard, Creator of Abe Martin (1952), Farrar, Straus and Young, NY
- Kelly, Fred C. (1953). "Have you a mistress?". In Birmingham, Frederic A. (ed.). The girls from Esquire. London: Arthur Barker. pp. 272–278.
