= Fred Harrison =

Fred Harrison may refer to:

- Fred Harrison (Australian footballer) (1893–1979), Australian rules footballer
- Fred Harrison (author) (born 1944), British author and economic commentator
- Fred Harrison (businessman), Australian businessman, CEO of Ritchies Stores
- Fred Harrison (footballer, born 1880) (1880–1969), English footballer
- Fred Harrison (rugby league), English rugby league footballer who played in the 1910s
- Frederic Harrison (1831–1923), British historian
- Frederick Harrison (railway manager) (1844–1914), British army officer and railway manager
- Frederick E. Harrison (1876–1962), Canadian politician
