= Frederick Baker (cricketer) =

Australian cricketer

Personal information
- Born: 5 August 1851; England
- Died: 14 September 1939 (aged 88); Perth, Australia

Domestic team information
- Years: Team
- 1877-1883: Victoria
- Source: Cricinfo, 7 June 2015

Frederick Baker (5 August 1851 – 14 September 1939) was an Australian cricketer. He played eight first-class cricket matches for Victoria between 1877 and 1883.

== See also ==
- List of Victoria first-class cricketers
