= Fred Aandahl =

Fred Aandahl may refer to:

- Frederick Aandahl (1887–1950), American architect
- Fred G. Aandahl (1897–1966), American politician
