= Lichen ruber moniliformis =

- Other names: Morbus moniliformis lichenoide, Wise-Rein disease, Nekam disease, keratosis lichenoides chronica
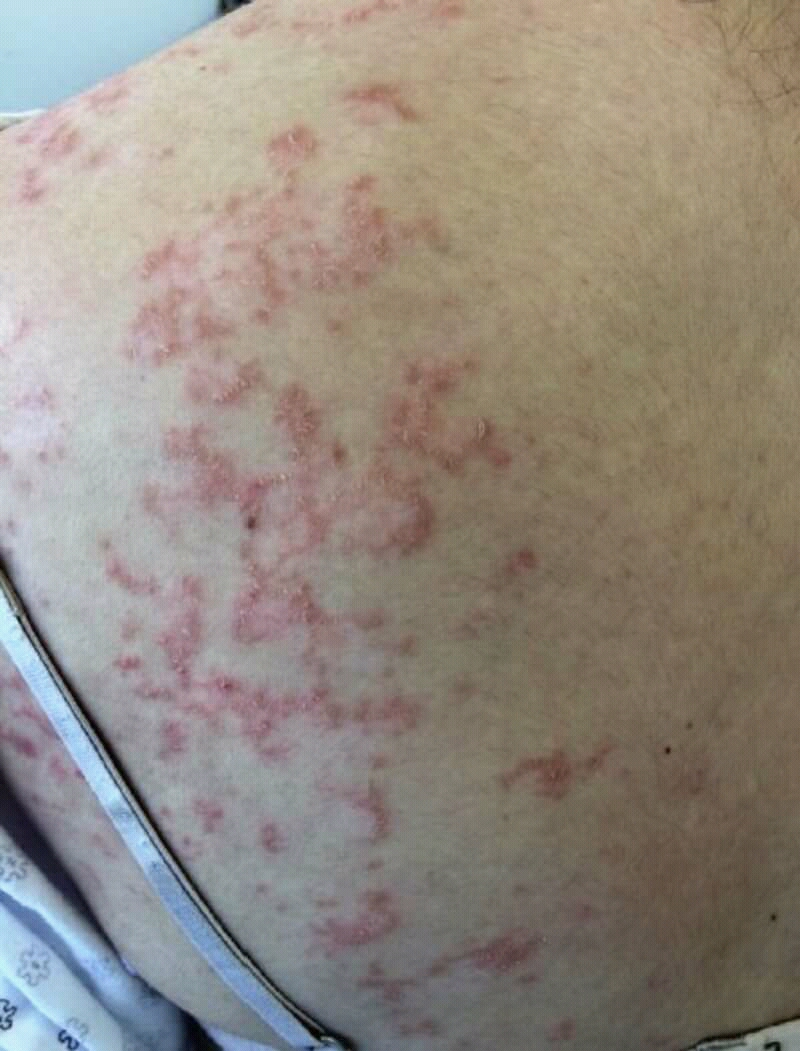
- Specialty: Dermatology

Lichen ruber moniliformis, also known as morbus moniliformis lichenoide, Wise-Rein disease, Nekam disease, keratosis lichenoides chronica, is a rare skin disease named for Fred Wise and Charles R. Rein.

It is one of several diseases also known as Kaposi's disease, based on its characterization in 1886 by Moritz Kaposi.

== Presentation ==
The disease causes numerous whitish punctiform papules and brownish macules arranged in a necklace-like pattern.

== See also ==
- Lichen planus
- List of cutaneous conditions
