= Mister Sister =

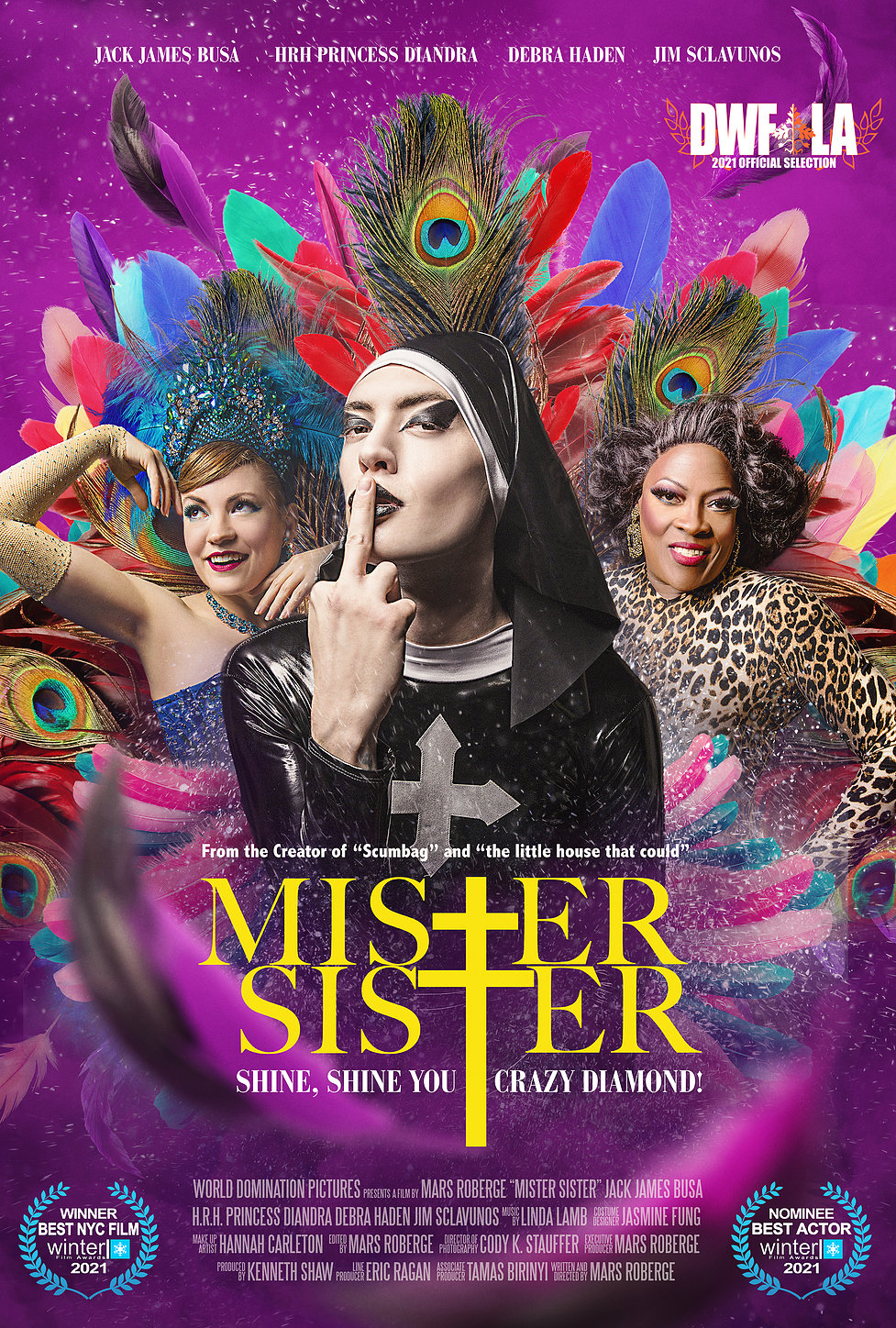
- Mister Sister official poster
- Directed by: Mars Roberge
- Written by: Mars Roberge
- Produced by: Mars Roberge; Kenneth Shaw; Eric Ragan; Tamas Birinyi
- Starring: Jack James Busa; HRH Princess Diandra; Debra Haden; Jim Sclavunos
- Cinematography: Cody K. Stauffer
- Edited by: Mars Roberge
- Music by: Linda Lamb
- Production company: World Domination Pictures
- Distributed by: World Domination Pictures
- Release date: September 12, 2021 (Dances With Films)
- Running time: 108 minutes
- Countries: United States; Canada
- Language: English

- "Mister Sister" was also the title given to the 1992 film Little Sister in the UK

Mister Sister is a 2021 Canadian-American dramedy film by the filmmaker Mars Roberge. It stars Jack James Busa, Princess Diandra and Debra Haden, along with the debut acting performance by Jim Sclavunos of Nick Cave and the Bad Seeds. It was also the last film performance by Ari Gold before his passing.

== Plot ==
A suicidal man from Milwaukee is given a second chance at life in NYC, working as a drag MC while learning the courage from the caring LGBTQ+ community to pursue his dreams, including a relationship with a tap dancing single mom.

== Production ==
=== Filming ===
Principal photography for Mister Sister began on 3 January 2020 in New York City under Roberge's film production company, World Domination Pictures. The entire movie was filmed over 12 days straight with the final day being the day before New York City's pandemic lockdown.

== Release ==
Mister Sister had its world premiere as the official closing night film for the 24th Dances With Films on 12 September 2021, held at TCL Chinese 6 Theatres in Hollywood. It then had its east coast premiere as the sold-out closing night film for the 10th Winter Film Awards International Film Festival held at Cinema Village on 30 September 2021.

== Music ==
Roberge released a music video of the song "Sad Sad Vampire" performed by Skunk in the Roses and containing footage from the film. A vinyl 12-inch single containing Rise NYC's "Rock 'n' Roll Manifesto (Thee Majesty Hip Dub Mix by Genesis Breyer P-Orridge)" and the b-side Binary Starr System's "What's Da T? (David J's Dub Science Mix)" was released through World Domination Records.

The score was written by Linda Lamb who also wrote the intro song to Roberge's prior feature, Scumbag. The final song performed in the movie is a cover of Brett Smiley's "Space Ace" performed by Jack James Busa + The Pious.

== Reception ==
OriginalRock.net reviewed the movie, writing that "Mister Sister will relentlessly tickle your senses with laughter, tears and a whole load of street rocking drag queen chit chat. Borrow, buy or steal it, but just f*cking see it."

MyIndieProductions reviewed the movie, writing that "Mister Sister is simply a joy, a fun journey covering some serious issues, as well as introducing some of its audience to a world they may not otherwise be exposed to, which in my opinion is commendable."

Film Threat reviewed the movie, writing that "Although Mister Sister lags, the real stars of the show, the drag queens, do not and are head to toe amazing. They take every scene seriously, along with their hair, make-up, clothes, jewelry, and dialogue."

=== Awards ===
- Best NYC Film at the Winter Film Awards International Film Festival (won)
- Best Actor at the Winter Film Awards International Film Festival (nominated, Jack James Busa)
