= Frederick D. Holliday =

American school superintentendent (1926–1985)

Frederick Douglass Holliday (May 20, 1926 – January 26, 1985), was an American educator who was superintendent of the Cleveland Metropolitan School District from 1982 until his suicide in 1985.

== Biography ==
Holliday was born on May 20, 1926 in Philadelphia. He graduated from Murrell Dobbins Vocational High School and served in the United States Navy during World War II. He received his Bachelor of Science and Master of Education degrees from Temple University and his Doctor of Education from Harvard University.

From 1950 to 1963, Holliday was an elementary school teacher. From 1963 to 1967, he was principal of the Alexander Wilson Elementary School in Philadelphia. He then worked as an assistant to Philadelphia's superintendent of schools, Mark R. Shedd. From 1969 to 1971, he was principal of Simon Gratz High School. He left the School District of Philadelphia to become an assistant superintendent in the Ann Arbor Public Schools, but returned the following year as an elementary school principal.

From 1971 to 1981, Holliday was superintendent of the York City School District. He was credited with saving the district from bankruptcy. He then spent a year as superintendent of the Plainfield Public School District, where he ended the district's desegregation busing in favor of returning to the neighborhood school system.

In 1982, Holliday became superintendent of the Cleveland Metropolitan School District. During his tenure, test scores increased and the district received its first school tax levy in over a decade. However, he was criticized by school board member Ed Young for being too close to the "white power establishment". On February 14, 1985, the school board voted to extend his contract by only one year, with only one of the four black members of the board, Stanley Tolliver, supporting his retention.

Holliday became depressed by the lack of support from the school board as well as the excessive bureaucracy and racial issues within the system. On Saturday, January 26, 1985, Holiday shot himself in the observation tower at Aviation High School. His body was found by a student two days later. In a typewritten suicide note, he blamed petty politics and greed of the board for his feelings of hopelessness.

Holliday is buried at Rolling Green Memorial Park in West Chester, Pennsylvania.
