= Frederick Newman (English cricketer) =

English cricketer

Frederick Charles William Newman (1896–1966) was an English cricketer whose first-class career spanned three decades between the two World Wars.

Newman was a right-handed opening or middle order batsman. He was born on 2 February 1892 in Luton, Bedfordshire and educated at Bedford Modern School where he first played for the first XI at the age of 13. In 1912, whilst still at school, he was selected to play for Bedfordshire and in 1914 played for the Leicestershire second XI.

After the War Newman joined Surrey and in 1919 made his debut against Cambridge University at Kennington Oval, scoring 54 in the county's first innings. Surrey's powerful batting line-up at this time included Jack Hobbs, Andrew Sandham, Andy Ducat and Percy Fender and Newman was unable to secure a regular first-team place; playing in only five of their first-class matches up to 1921 when he left the county. He also played a single first-class match for H.D.G. Leveson-Gower's XI in 1919 against Oxford University.

In 1926 he was appointed Private Secretary to Sir Julien Cahn, the retail magnate and cricket benefactor. Newman was responsible for organising Cahn's invitational side, including its overseas tours from 1928. Sir Julien Cahn's XI was accorded first-class status between 1932–38, and Newman played several matches, making his highest score of 101 against Leicestershire at West Bridgford in 1935.

After Cahn's death in 1938 Newman continued to play competitive cricket and turned out for Nottinghamshire in non-first-class matches between 1942–44.

In all, Newman scored 442 first-class runs at an average of 23.26, making one century and two fifties. He was also an occasional right-arm bowler and took one first-class wicket at the cost of 80 runs.

Frederick Newman died on 1 January 1966 at Malpas, Cornwall.
