= Fred Goldsmith =

Fred Goldsmith may refer to:

- Fred Goldsmith (American football) (born 1944), American college football coach
- Fred Goldsmith (Australian footballer) (1932–2017), Brownlow Medal winning footballer
- Fred Goldsmith (baseball) (1856–1939), American baseball pitcher

== See also ==
- Frederick Goldsmith, bishop
- Frederick Goldsmid, MP
