= Fred Brown (footballer, born 1931) =

English footballer

Personal information
- Full name: Frederick Brown
- Date of birth: 6 December 1931
- Place of birth: Leyton, England
- Date of death: November 2013 (aged 81)
- Place of death: Surrey, England
- Position: Goalkeeper

Senior career*
Years	Team	Apps	(Gls)
19??–1952	Leytonstone		
1952–1955	Aldershot	106	(0)
1955–1958	West Bromwich Albion	11	(0)
1958–1960	Portsmouth	18	(0)
- Poole Town
- Tunbridge Wells United
- Chertsey Town
- Horsham YMCA
- * Club domestic league appearances and goals

Frederick Brown (6 December 1931 – November 2013) was an English professional footballer who made 135 appearances in the Football League playing as a goalkeeper for Aldershot, West Bromwich Albion and Portsmouth. He also played non-league football for Leytonstone, Poole Town, Tunbridge Wells United, Chertsey Town and Horsham YMCA.

Brown was born in 1931 in Leyton, which was then in Essex, and died in Surrey in 2013 at the age of 81.
