= Fred Wise (physician) =

American dermatologist

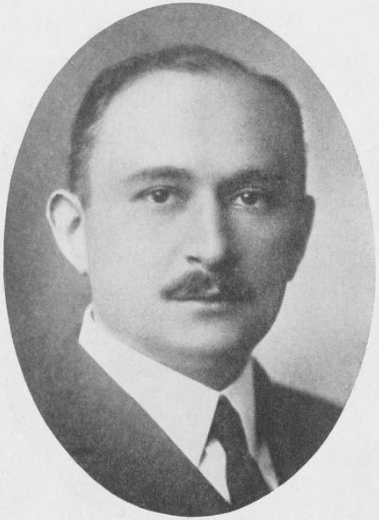
- Born: October 3, 1881
- Died: July 26, 1950 (aged 68); New York, New York, US
- Occupation: Dermatologist

Fred Wise (October 3, 1881 – July 26, 1950) was an American dermatologist. He is a co-eponym of Wise-Rein disease along with Charles R. Rein.

== Biography ==
Fred Wise was born on October 3, 1881.

He died at Memorial Hospital in Manhattan on July 26, 1950.
