= Fred Sanford =

Fred Sanford may refer to:

- Fred Sanford (baseball) (1919–2011), Major League Baseball pitcher
- Fred Sanford (musician) (1947–2000), percussionist, teacher, composer, and clinician
- Fred G. Sanford, fictional character in the 1972 sitcom Sanford and Son
