= Fred Sherman =

Fred Sherman may refer to:

- Fred Sherman (business commentator) (1924–2009), American economist, businessman and business commentator based in Philadelphia, Pennsylvania
- Fred Sherman (actor) (1905–1969), American actor
- Fred Sherman (scientist) (1932–2013), American geneticist and molecular biologist
