= Fred Hill (baseball) =

American baseball player (born 1900)

- Infielder
- Born: 1900; Texas, U.S.
- Batted: Right Threw: Right

Negro league baseball debut
- 1923, for the Milwaukee Bears

Last appearance
- 1923, for the Milwaukee Bears

Teams
- Milwaukee Bears (1923)

Fred Hill (born 1900, date of death unknown) was an American Negro league infielder in the 1920s.

A native of Texas, Hill played for the Milwaukee Bears in 1923. In 18 recorded games, he posted 12 hits in 66 plate appearances.
