= Frederick Hill (politician) =

Florida politician

Member of the Florida House of Representatives from the Gadsden County district
- In office 1868–1870

Florida State Senate
- In office 1871–1872

Frederick Hill was an African-American politician in Florida during the Reconstruction era. He was a delegate to the 1868 Florida Constitutional Convention and represented Gadsden County in the Florida Legislature. He also served as a Gadsden County Commissioner and was the postmaster in Quincy, Florida for several years.

He served in the Florida House of Representatives representing Gadsden County from 1868 until 1870 and then in the Florida State Senate from 1871 until 1872.

In 1868, the New York Tribune described him as being "an intelligent full blooded African." In 1874, he was accused of being on the receiving end of a bribery scheme related to the impeachment of Harrison Reed.

William Saunders, also African American, was another representative for Gadsden County during Reconstruction.

== See also ==
- African American officeholders from the end of the Civil War until before 1900
