= Fred Glover =

Fred Glover may refer to:

- Fred Glover (ice hockey), Canadian NHL player and coach.
- Fred W. Glover, computer scientist, inventor of tabu search and of the term "meta-heuristic"
