= Frederick Walter Robinson =

Frederick Walter Robinson (nickname Doc Robbie) (1888–1971) was an Australian academic at the University of Queensland. He was the founder of the university's Fryer Library and one of the instigators of the John Oxley Library (now part of the State Library of Queensland).

== Early life ==
Frederick Walter Robinson was born in Sydney, Australia in 1888, the son of Joseph Kitson Robinson and his wife Jenny Horne. He was educated at Sydney Boys' High School and the University of Sydney, where he took his B.A with Honours in 1909 and M.A. with Honours graduating in 1910. He won prizes and scholarships in English and classics including the Cooper travelling scholarship, which he used to study at the University of Jena, Germany. He was awarded his Ph.D., magna cum laude, for his thesis in German on Roman history. He returned to Australia where he was an assistant professor and taught modern languages at the Royal Military College, Duntroon in 1913.

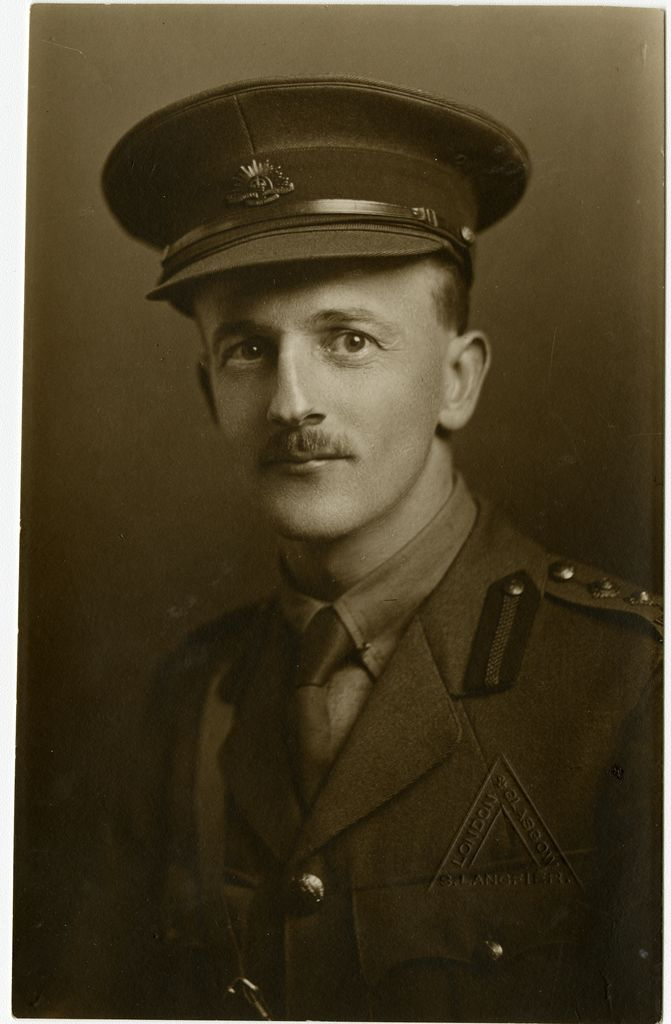
Capt. F. W. Robinson, from the University of Queensland, Fryer Library Collection

== World War I Service ==
After World War I broke out, Robinson organised courses in intelligence at Duntroon until he enlisted in September 1915. Influenced by his religious upbringing and the commandment, 'Thou shalt not kill', he joined the 8th Field Ambulance, Australian Army Medical Corps, Australian Imperial Force. He was commissioned and promoted honorary captain. From January 1917 Robinson served as intelligence officer with the 5th Division. He was mentioned in dispatches. In July 1918 he was appointed to the Australian Corps School in France and the Education Service School in Cambridge. He became assistant director of education, A.I.F. depots in Britain.

Robinson married Catherine Campbell Robertson-Glasgow, a voluntary hospital worker on May 14, 1919 in London, and they returned to Australia and his work at Duntroon. He had developed an admiration for the city of Canberra and his book, Canberra's First Hundred Years (1924) reflected that respect.

== Move to Queensland ==
In 1923, Robinson accepted a position as lecturer in English and German at the University of Queensland. As a young lecturer in the 1920s under the auspices of the English and Modern Languages Association of Queensland, Robinson led a group of university and school teachers of English to conduct a local version of Henry Newbolt's report on the teaching of English in England.

The Report on the teaching of English in secondary schools in Queensland, published in October 1927, was the result of four years of characteristically methodical work by Robinson, involving the collation of responses to detailed questionnaires sent to every secondary school in Queensland as well as a considered response to some of the key issues – such as the relative importance of literary and language studies – raised by Newbolt.

Robinson served briefly as a Major in intelligence work during World War II and then mainly as a censor for the war effort. He was promoted to associate professor of English in 1946, due to J.D. Story's cautious management of the university. Robinson retired as head of department in 1958 and the university awarded him an honorary doctorate of letters in 1968.

== Legacy ==
Robinson died in 1971. He was survived by his wife and four children. He had been chairman of the John Oxley Memorial Committee, which led to the development of the State Library of Queensland and had inspired the founding of the Fryer Memorial Library of Australian Literature. The original library was stored in a cedar, glass-fronted bookcase in his university office and this cabinet remains on show within the Duhig Building. Thirty-three of his boxes of papers, correspondence and letters are held in the Fryer Library, documenting his work within Queensland and in supporting the establishment of the university at St Lucia.

== Publications ==
- Robinson, Frederick Walter (1957), The University of Queensland, St. Lucia, Brisbane, University of Queensland Press
