= Fred Small =

Fred or Frederick Small may refer to:

- Fred Small (singer-songwriter) (born 1952), American singer-songwriter
- Fred Small (American football) (1963–2003), American football player
- Frederick L. Small (1866–1918), American convicted murderer

== See also ==
- Fred Smalls (born 1963), former American football linebacker
- S. Frederick Small, better known as Daddy Freddy (born 1965), Jamaican ragga vocalist
