= Fred Vinson (disambiguation) =

Fred M. Vinson (1890–1953) was a politician who served as United States Secretary of the Treasury and Chief Justice of the United States.

Fred Vinson may also refer to:

- Fred Vinson (basketball) (born 1971), American professional basketball player
- Fred Vinson (American football) (born 1977), American football defensive back
