= Fred Robinson (footballer, born 1881) =

English footballer

Personal information
- Date of birth: 1881
- Place of birth: Belper, England
- Height: 5 ft 6 in (1.68 m)
- Position: Inside forward

Senior career*
Years	Team	Apps	(Gls)
1904–1905	Belper Town		
1905–1907	Grimsby Town	32	(8)
1907–19??	Rotherham County		
- * Club domestic league appearances and goals

Fred Robinson (1881 – after 1906) was an English professional footballer who played as an inside forward.
