= Fred Harris (Australian footballer) =

Australian rules footballer (1937–2019)

Personal information
- Full name: Frederick Harris
- Born: 16 January 1937
- Died: 13 January 2019 (aged 81); Echuca, Victoria
- Original team: Port Melbourne District
- Height: 179 cm (5 ft 10 in)
- Weight: 81 kg (179 lb)

Playing career^{1}
Years	Club	Games (Goals)
1957–59	South Melbourne	19 (0)
- ^{1} Playing statistics correct to the end of 1959.

Fred Harris (16 January 1937 – 13 January 2019) was an Australian rules footballer who played with South Melbourne in the Victorian Football League (VFL).
