= Fred Webster (cricketer, born 1897) =

English cricketer

Fred Webster (7 May 1897 – 28 July 1931) was an English cricketer active from 1925 to 1927 who played for Lancashire. He was born in Accrington and died in Burnley. He appeared in two first-class matches as a lefthanded batsman who bowled left arm fast-medium pace. He scored twelve runs with a highest score of 10 and held one catch. He took seven wickets with a best analysis of three for 34.
