= Fred Elliott (disambiguation) =

Fred Elliott is character from the soap opera Coronation Street.

Fred Elliott may also refer to:

- Fred Elliott (footballer) (1879–1960), Australian rules football player
- Fred Elliott (ice hockey) (1903–1982), Canadian ice hockey player

== See also ==
- Frederick Wellington Elliott (1873–1933), farmer and political figure in Ontario
