= Fred Wright (historian) =

British historian and theologian (born 1947)

Frederick Wright (born 1947) is a British historian and theologian who has written extensively on the subject of the persecution of the Jewish people throughout history and is one of the few evangelical scholars to interface with the challenge of Theology after Auschwitz and subsequently propose a Theology of Catastrophe. Later works concentrate on philosophical tensions within Jewish - Christian debate and ethical vectors relating to the dynamics of decision-making in the historical process.

His next title, Ethical Vectors in Warfare, is due to be published in 2019

The Cross became a Sword: The Soldiers of Christ and the First Crusade, in addition to dealing with the historical events investigates both the character of the magnates in addition to their personal and group theologies.

== Works ==
=== Book ===
- Wright, Fred. Words From The Scroll Of Fire. Jerusalem: Four Corners Publishing. ISBN 965-222-579-7.
- ——— (1995). The Cross Became a Sword - The Soldiers Of Christ And The First Crusade. Harpenden, UK: RW Publishing. ISBN 9781900475006. OCLC 34516361.
- ——— (2002). Father, Forgive Us: A Christian Response to the Church's Heritage of Jewish Persecution. London: Olive Press & Monarch Books. ISBN 9781854246059. OCLC 51272719.
- ——— (2004). Within the Pale. Colchester, UK: Chesed Publishing. ISBN 0-9547438-0-6.
- ——— (2018). The Dark Legacy of Martin Luther' - The Devil, the Jews And German Nationalism. Colchester, UK: Chesed Publishing. ISBN 978-0244146979.
- ——— (2019). A Banner to the Nations. Colchester, UK: Chesed Publishing. ISBN 978-0-244-50020-7.

=== Edited by ===
- ———, ed. (1998). Roots and Branches: Explorations into the Jewish Context of the Christian Faith. Bedford, UK: PWM Publishing & Centre for Biblical and Hebraic Studies. ISBN 9781872395456. OCLC 41581963. - chapter(s) by Wright
- ———, ed. (2005). Israel, His people, His land, His story: ten authors reflect on biblical and historical themes, with contributions on terrorism and peacemaking. Eastbourne, UK: Thankful Books. ISBN 9781905084036. OCLC 234199443. - chapter(s) by Wright
