= Fred Newton (swimmer) =

American swimmer

Personal information
- Born: 1903 Clinton, Oklahoma, US
- Died: 1992 (aged 88–89) Gainesville, Texas, US

Sport
- Sport: Swimming

Fred Newton (1903 – 1992) was an American swimmer who was known for being the first person to swim the full length of the Mississippi River. Over the course of 176 days in 1930, Newton swam from Minneapolis, near the source of the Mississippi River, to New Orleans, a city at its mouth.

== Swim of the Mississippi River ==
Newton pursued the journey primarily to generate publicity and wealth. At age 27, he began the swim on July 6, 1930, in Minneapolis with his brother, Byron, following in a rowboat with supplies. He initially predicted that the journey would take 90 days, though it ended up taking almost twice as long. They stopped in towns along the way, with Newton painting signs for room and board. During the journey, Newton encountered pollution and cold temperatures. He used wool clothing and axle grease to keep himself warm.

Newton arrived in New Orleans on December 29, 1930. He was welcomed by a crowd and was offered a bath by the New Orleans Athletic Club. In total, the swim was 1,826 miles and Newton was in the water for 742 hours.

== Biography ==
Fred Newton was born in 1903 in Boydell, Arkansas. His historic swim was not successful in generating publicity and wealth. In his later career, Newton became an insurance salesman and then started a company selling orthopedic products. Newton died in Gainesville, Texas in 1992 at the age of 89.
