= Frederick R. Baker =

American politician (b. 1844, d. 1906)

Frederick Richard Baker (c. 1844–1906) was an American farmer, soldier, and politician.

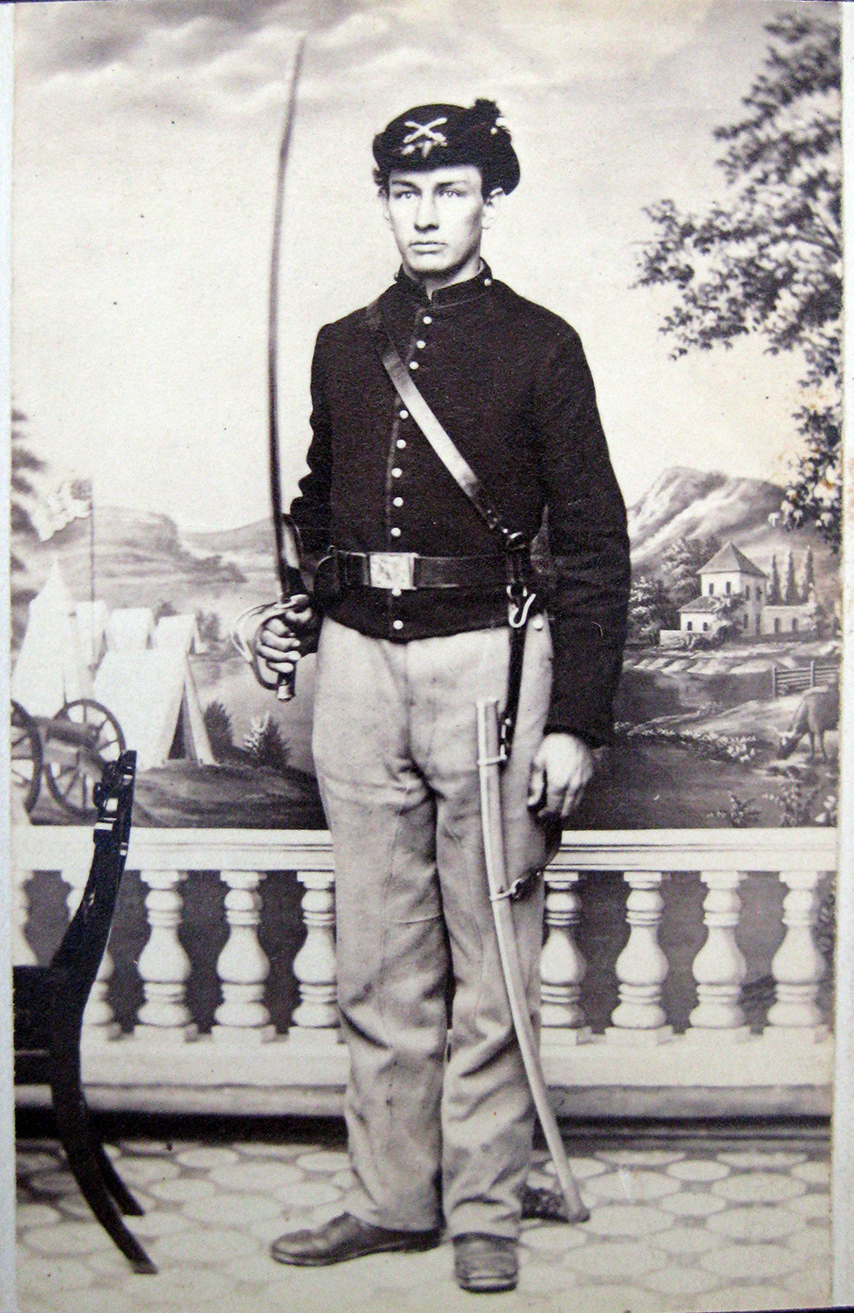
Private Frederick R. Baker, member of the Union Light Guard from 1863 to 1865

== Biography ==
Frederick Baker was born in Spratton, Northamptonshire, England. He emigrated from there with his parents and seven siblings to Elyria, Ohio in 1852. In 1863, he was selected to be a member of the Seventh Independent Company of Ohio Volunteer Cavalry, also known as the Union Light Guard. Soon after arriving in Washington D.C. members of the unit learned they were selected to serve as a mounted escort and guard for President Abraham Lincoln.

During the year of 1865 Baker kept a diary of his experiences as a member of the Union Light Guard. The diary reveals that he was a frequent observer of the proceedings at the Senate and House, was exposed to the workings of a wartime White House, and had casual contact with Lincoln and other dignitaries, witnessed Lincoln's second inauguration, and was part of the events immediately following the President's assassination. Frederick served from December 17, 1863, to September 9, 1865.

Baker homesteaded in Ft. Collins, Colorado in 1873. He established himself as a successful farmer, rancher, businessman, civic leader, and community member. Baker served as Larimer County commissioner from 1890 to 1893 and Ft. Collins mayor for four terms from 1895 to 1902. During his time as mayor Lincoln Park and Carnegie library in Fort Collins were conceived.

Baker's residence while mayor of Ft. Collins was listed on the National Register of Historic Places on July 20, 1978. In January 2019, Baker's 1865 Civil War Diary was donated to the Ft. Collins Local History Archive located at the Fort Collins Museum of Discovery.
