= Fred Valentine (footballer, born 1909) =

English footballer

Personal information
- Full name: Frederick Edward Valentine
- Date of birth: 1909
- Place of birth: Birkenhead, England
- Date of death: 1981 (aged 71–72)
- Height: 5 ft 6 1/2 in (1.69 m)
- Position: Outside forward

Senior career*
Years	Team	Apps	(Gls)
- Runcorn
1935–1936	Hyde United	39	(16)
1936–1937	Oldham Athletic	5	(0)
- * Club domestic league appearances and goals

Frederick Edward Valentine (1909–1981) was an English professional footballer who played as an outside forward for Oldham Athletic.
