= Fred Nomens =

Australian rules footballer

Personal information
- Full name: Frederick August Nomens
- Born: 4 October 1869; Newstead, Victoria
- Died: 4 January 1953 (aged 83); Auburn, Victoria
- Original teams: Hawthorn (VJFA), Essendon (VFA)

Playing career^{1}
Years	Club	Games (Goals)
1897	Fitzroy	2 (1)
- ^{1} Playing statistics correct to the end of 1897.

Frederick August Nomens (4 October 1869 – 4 January 1953) was an Australian rules footballer who played with Fitzroy in the Victorian Football League (VFL).

== Sources ==
- Holmesby, Russell & Main, Jim (2009). The Encyclopedia of AFL Footballers. 8th ed. Melbourne: Bas Publishing.
- Fred Nomens's playing statistics from AFL Tables
- Fred Nomens at AustralianFootball.com
