= Fred Baron =

Fred Baron may refer to:

- Fred Baron (footballer) (1901–1993), English footballer
- Fred Baron (lawyer) (1947–2008), American trial lawyer
- Fred Baron (producer) (born 1954), American film producer

== See also ==
- Fred Barron (1879–1939), English football wing half
- Fred Barron (producer), American television producer, created My Family
