= Fred Lane (rugby league) =

Australian rugby league footballer

Personal information
- Full name: Frederick Lane
- Born: 13 December 1919
- Died: 1977 (aged 57–58)

Playing information
- Position: Lock, Second-row
Club
Years	Team	Pld	T	G	FG	P
1941–47	South Sydney	55	2	0	0	6
- Source: As of 6 December 2022

Fred Lane (1919–1977) was an Australian former professional rugby league footballer who played in the 1940s. He played for the South Sydney in the New South Wales Rugby League (NSWRL) competition.

== Playing career ==
Lane made his first grade debut for South Sydney in round 4 of the 1941 NSWRL season against Canterbury-Bankstown at Belmore Oval. Lane played for South Sydney during a difficult time in the clubs history where they only made the finals once between 1940-1948. Lane missed the entire 1945 season where Souths finished last but returned in 1946 and played in 14 games which saw South Sydney finish bottom for a second consecutive year however this time the club failed to win a single match. Lane's final game for Souths was in round 1 of the 1947 season against St. George. During his playing career, Lane went by the nickname "Sandy".
