= Friedrich Ludwig von Keller =

Swiss-German jurist (1799–1860)

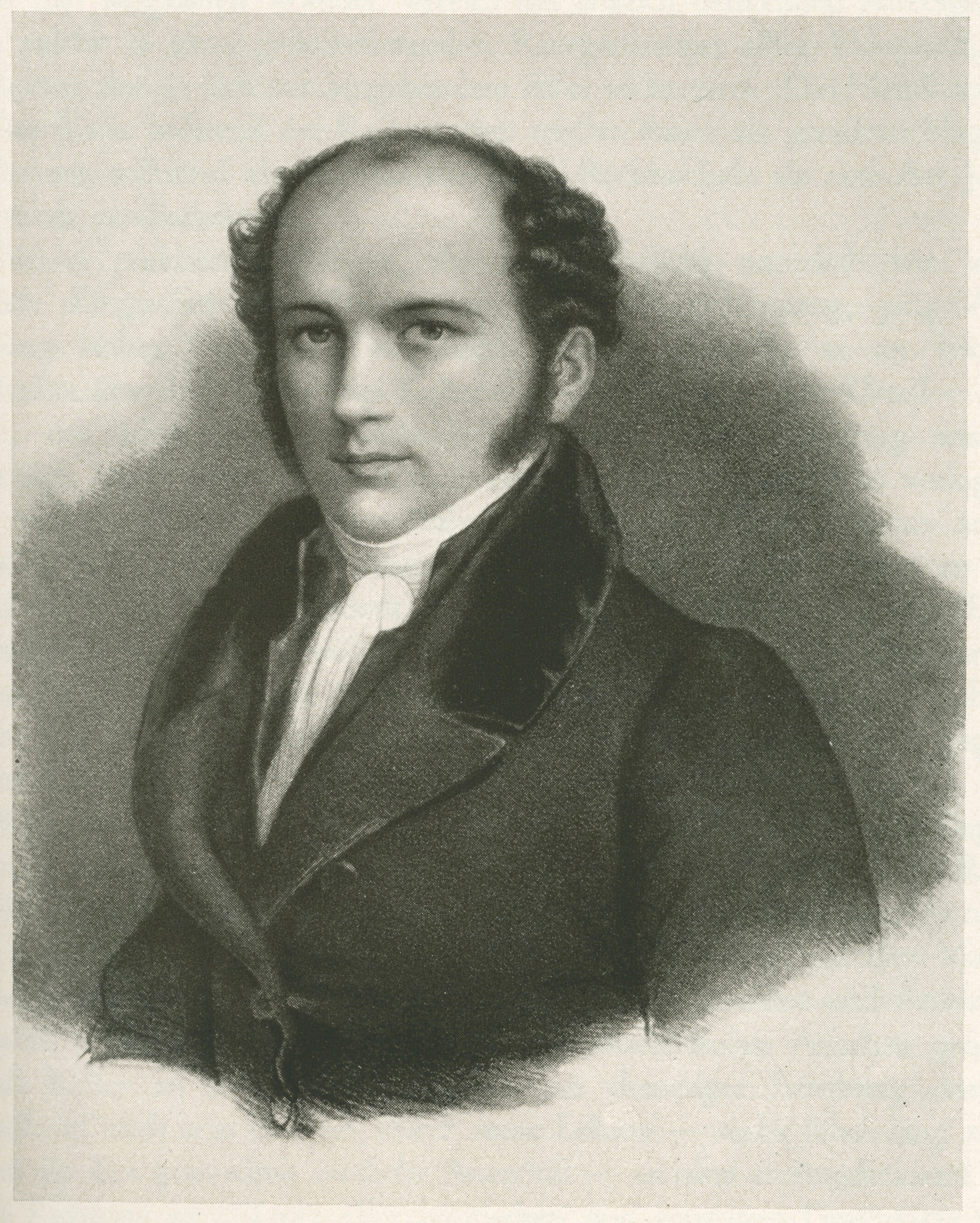
Friedrich Ludwig von Keller (date unknown)

Friedrich Ludwig von Keller (17 October 1799, in Zürich – 11 September 1860, in Berlin) was a Swiss-German jurist.

== Biography ==
He was educated at Berlin and Göttingen, where he was a pupil of Savigny. In 1825, he returned to Zürich where he was appointed professor of civil law in the university. He was a leader of the Liberal Radical party and in 1831 became head of the Swiss justiciary. In 1843-47 he was professor in the University of Halle. He then moved to Berlin, where he became professor at the university. He became a conservative member of the Prussian House of Representatives, and because of his services to the monarchical party was ennobled.

== Works ==
- Ueber Litiskontestation und Urteil (Zürich 1827)
- Der römische Civilprocess und die Aktionen in summarischer Darstellung zum Gebrauche bei Vorlesungen (Leipzig 1852; 6th ed., 1883)

His Vorlesungen über die Pandekten was edited by Emil Albert Friedberg (1861), and by William Lewis (1867).
