= Frederick Newman (Australian cricketer) =

Australian cricketer

Personal information
- Born: 7 November 1909; Fremantle, Western Australia
- Died: 28 March 1977 (aged 67); Fremantle, Western Australia
- Source: Cricinfo, 28 September 2017

Frederick Newman (7 November 1909 – 28 March 1977) was an Australian cricketer. He played two first-class matches for Western Australia in 1935/36 and 1936/37.
