= Frederick R. Jackson =

American soldier and recipient of the Medal of Honor

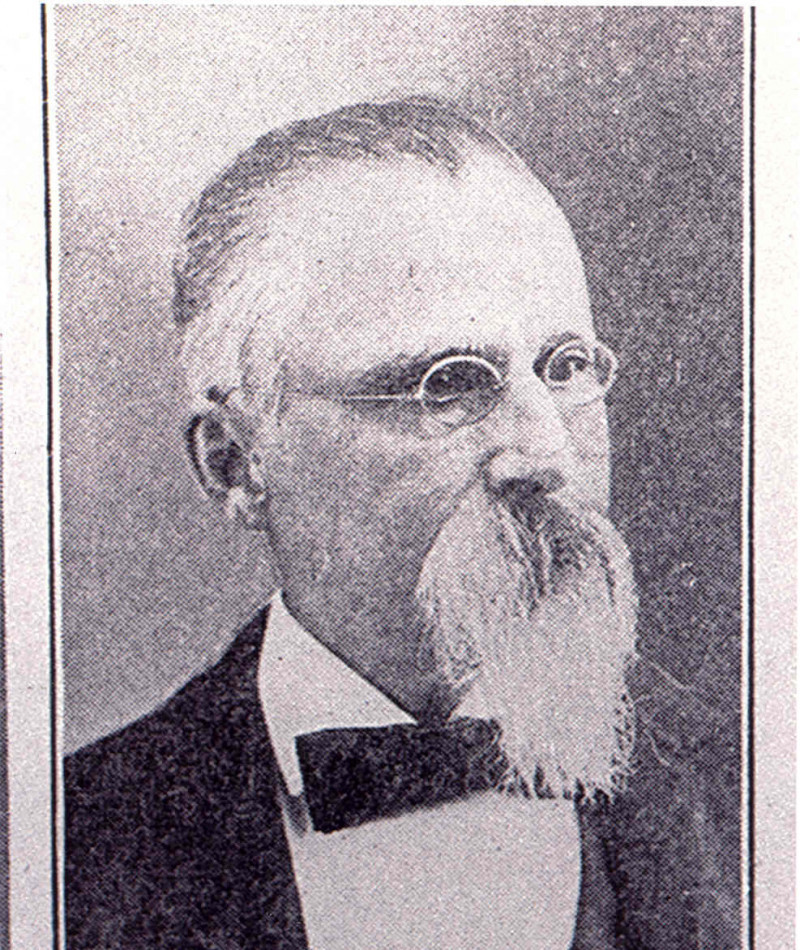
Frederick R. Jackson

Frederick Randolph Jackson (February 18, 1844 – February 14, 1925) was an American soldier and recipient of the Medal of Honor who earned the award for his actions during the American Civil War.

== Biography ==
Jackson was born in New Haven, Connecticut on February 18, 1844. He served as first sergeant in Company F of the 7th Regiment Connecticut Volunteer Infantry. He earned his medal in action at James Island, South Carolina on June 16, 1862. By the end of the war he had reached the rank of Sergeant Major. His medal was issued in 1862. He died in Smithville, New York on February 14, 1925, and is buried in Smithville Cemetery, Smithville, New York.

== Medal of Honor Citation ==
For extraordinary heroism on 16 June 1862, in action at James Island, South Carolina. Having his left arm shot away in a charge on the enemy, First Sergeant Jackson continued on duty, taking part in a second and a third charge until he fell exhausted from the loss of blood.
