= Fred R. Angevine =

American attorney and politician

Missoula County Attorney
- In office 1916–1918

Personal details
- Born: Fred Rufus Angevine; February 14, 1889 Missoula, Montana Territory, U.S.
- Died: April 24, 1956 (aged 67) Helena, Montana, U.S.
- Party: Democratic
- Spouses: Bernice Moderie (m. 1919, divorced) Edna Tenhoopen (m. 1926, divorced) Antoinette Tucci (m. 1945, divorced)
- Children: 1
- Education: University of Washington (LLB)

Military service
- Branch/service: United States Army
- Years of service: August 1, 1918 – December 4, 1918
- Rank: Second Lieutenant
- Battles/wars: World War I

Fred Rufus Angevine (February 14, 1889 – April 24, 1956) was an American attorney and Democratic politician from Montana.

== Biography ==
Fred Rufus Angevine was born on February 14, 1889, in Missoula, Montana, then a part of the Territory of Montana, to Rufus William Angevine (1855–1946) and Ann Etta Jones (1860–1932). His parents were from the Canadian province of Nova Scotia, and married in Duluth, Minnesota, where his father was a police officer. The family migrated to Montana around 1886, when his father was a construction foreman for the Northern Pacific Railway. Known as R. W. Angevine, his father was the Missoula chief of police and two-term auditor of Missoula County, owned a grain and stock farm in nearby Clinton, and had further experience as a general contractor.

Angevine graduated from Missoula County High School in 1907. He studied law at the University of Washington, graduating with an LL.B. degree in 1912. In 1919, in Seattle, he married his first wife, Bernice Moderie, a fellow native Missoulan.

Angevine was elected county attorney for Missoula County in 1916. He was a member of the Democratic Party. He left office in 1918, being succeeded by deputy county attorney Dwight N. Mason, and was drafted into the United States Army during World War I, being commissioned as a second lieutenant in August 1918 at Camp Pike, North Little Rock, Arkansas. He was mustered out on December 4, 1918.

After his service in the Army, Angevine moved to Washington, D.C., where he was named assistant solicitor for the penal division of the Bureau of Internal Revenue under presidents Woodrow Wilson and Warren G. Harding. He would later form the law firm Johnson & Shores in Washington, and a tax law practice in New York City. Angevine argued before the United States Supreme Court and U.S. Court of Appeals in tax and estate cases. He lectured at the Alexander Blewett III School of Law in Missoula while living in D.C. In 1940, he was named secretary of the taxation committee of the New York City Bar Association.

In 1926, Angevine married Edna Tenhoopen (1896–1977). He married actress Antoinette Tucci (1919–2010) in 1945 in Mexico City, Mexico. With Tucci, he had one child, Cleo (1947–2016). Angevine returned to Montana sometime before his death in Helena on April 24, 1956.
