= Frederick E. B. Harvey =

British diplomat

Frederick E. B. Harvey (traditional Chinese: 夏福禮, simplified Chinese: 夏福礼) was a British diplomat who served as H.M.'s Consul in China during the mid-19th century. He retired on a pension in 1868.

== Career ==
Dec 1852 or before: Jul 1853 or after	(Hong Kong) Secretary to Her Majesty′s Plenipotentiary and Chief Superintendent of British Trade in China
Nov 1857 or before: Dec 1858	Vice-Consul at Shanghai
Jan 1859 - Sep 1864	Consul at Ningbo
Sep 1864 - 1868	Consul at Zhenjiang
