= Fred Waters (American football) =

American football player (1878–1943)

Frederick Lafavor Waters (December 31, 1878 in Denver, Colorado – November 10, 1943 in Chicago, Illinois) was an American football player and a starting quarterback for the University of Notre Dame.

Waters assumed the role of starting quarterback at Notre Dame in 1897, after player-coach Frank Hering gave up the position to assume full-time coaching duties of both the football and basketball teams. He led the Irish to a record of 4-1-1 in his only season as a starter, including a 34–6 victory over Michigan State on Thanksgiving Day in the first ever meeting between the two schools.

Following his graduation, Waters relocated to Chicago, Illinois where he worked for the Chicago, Milwaukee, St. Paul and Pacific Railroad until his retirement in 1939.
