= Fred Curatolo =

Cartoonist

- Born: 1958 (age 67–68); Toronto, Ontario, Canada
- Occupation: Newspaper cartoonist

Fred Curatolo (born 1958) is a freelance editorial cartoonist.

Born in Toronto, Ontario, Curatolo studied at the esteemed visual arts program at C.W. Jefferys Collegiate Institute from 1974 to 1978. After encouragement from an instructor, he began serious editorial cartooning in 1982, and was first published in 1983 at the Toronto Sun. Curatolo started his cartooning full-time at the Brampton Guardian in 1986. In 1989, Fred moved to Edmonton, Alberta to join the Edmonton Sun as staff editorial cartoonist and continued this position until 2006. Having been published in numerous papers across Canada, Fred's work was also featured in the former local weekly See Magazine. Currently he is drawing for the St. Albert Leader.

== Influences ==
An avid comic book collector, Curatolo states that his main influences have been from Jack Davis and Mort Drucker of Mad magazine, along with Will Eisner. Known for his speed and memory for drawing faces, Curatolo often sketches his ideas on napkins when away from his drawing table. The editorial cartoonist that has made the biggest impression on him is fellow Ontario cartoonist and friend Andy Donato. Fred has also taught classes on comic book technique at Happy Harbor Comics. Fred now offers classes at Artisti Academy.
