= Fred Shields =

Fred or Frederic Shields may refer to:

- Fred Shields (soccer) (1912–1985), American soccer player born Fred Zbikowski
- Fred J. Shields, American minister, academic, and educator
- Frederic Shields (1833–1911), English artist and designer
- Fred Shields (1904–1974), actor best known for voicing the Great Prince of the Forest in Disney's Bambi
