= Fred Moore (English footballer) =

English footballer

Personal information
- Place of birth: Worksop, England
- Position: Forward

Senior career*
Years	Team	Apps	(Gls)
- Anston Athletic
1927	Bradford City	6	(3)
- Worksop Town
- Halifax Town
- * Club domestic league appearances and goals

Fred Moore was an English professional footballer who played as a forward.

== Career ==
Born in Worksop, Moore joined Bradford City from Anston Athletic in February 1927. He made 6 league appearances for the club, scoring 3 goals. He left the club in June 1927 to join Worksop Town, and later played for Halifax Town.

== Sources ==
- Frost, Terry (1988). Bradford City A Complete Record 1903-1988. Breedon Books Sport. ISBN 0-907969-38-0.
