= Fred Archer =

Fred or Frederick Archer may refer to:

- Fred Archer (jockey) (1857–1886), English jockey
- Fred R. Archer (1889–1963), photographer and co-inventor of the photographic Zone System
- Frederick Scott Archer (1813–1857), inventor of the photographic collodion process
- Fred Archer (writer) (1915–1999), English farmer and author
- Fred Archer (baseball) (1910–1981), American baseball player
- Fred V. Archer (1888–1971), American college football head coach
- Fred W. Archer (1859–1936), member of the Legislative Assembly of Alberta, 1913–1917
- Frederic Archer (1838–1901), British composer and organist
- Frederick Archer (cricketer) (1888–1937), Barbadian cricketer
