= Fred Murphy (ice hockey) =

Irish-born Canadian ice hockey player

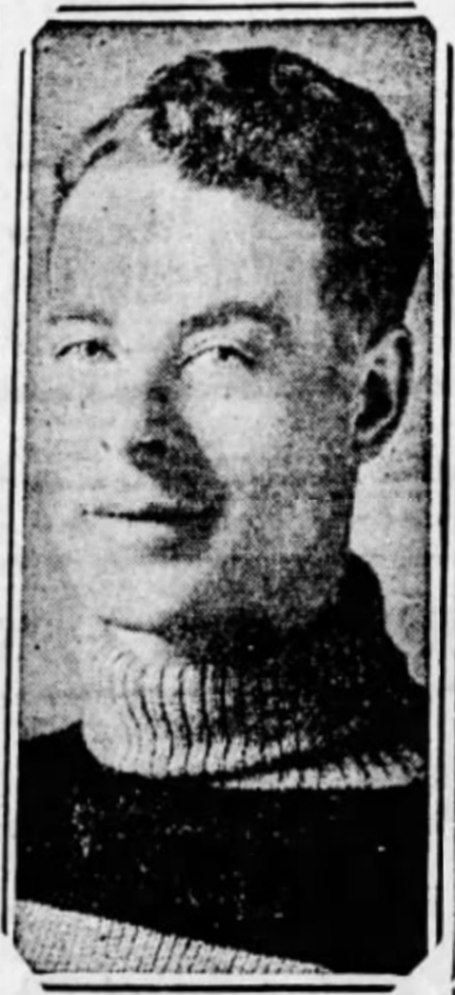
- Murphy circa 1920
- Born: September 7, 1896; Coleraine, Ireland, U.K.
- Died: September 20, 1975 (aged 79); Vancouver, British Columbia, Canada
- Position: Centre
- Played for: Portland Rosebuds; Victoria Aristocrats
- Playing career: 1917–1925

Frederick Richard Murphy (September 7, 1896 – September 20, 1975) was an Irish-born Canadian professional ice hockey player. He played with the Portland Rosebuds and the Victoria Aristocrats of the Pacific Coast Hockey Association between 1917 and 1920.

During the 1917–18 season, Murphy coached the Vancouver Amazons women's team, claiming provincial honors.

During the 1920s, Murphy was also a referee in various senior, intermediate and junior leagues in Vancouver.
