= George Barker (footballer, born 1885) =

Australian rules footballer (1885–1947)

Personal information
- Full name: George Sanders Barker
- Born: 26 September 1885; Collingwood, Victoria
- Died: 15 April 1947 (aged 61); Malvern East, Victoria
- Original team: Abbotsford

Playing career^{1}
Years	Club	Games (Goals)
1903–1909	Essendon	47 (74)
- ^{1} Playing statistics correct to the end of 1909.

George Sanders Barker (26 September 1885 – 15 April 1947) was an Australian rules footballer who played with Essendon in the Victorian Football League (VFL).

Barker, who was from Abbotsford, was Essendon's leading goal-kicker in 1905, with 29 goals. His tally that year included a seven goal haul in a win over Collingwood at Victoria Park. The following year he played in the Victorian Football Association (VFA) with Richmond, before returning to Essendon in 1907. He played for Northcote between 1910 and 1912.
