= Christopher Norton =

British pianist and composer (bor 1953)

Christopher Garth Norton (born June 22, 1953) is a British-Canadian pianist and composer of jazz music. His is best known for his piano learning repertoire, especially through ABRSM and The Royal Conservatory of Music.

== Education ==
Norton was born in New Zealand. He worked as a composer-in-schools for a year after finishing his studies at the University of Otago, then freelanced as a composer, arranger and pianist. He moved to the UK in 1977 on a New Zealand Government Scholarship. He studied at York University, taught by Wilfred Meyers and David Blake.

== Career ==
Norton's earliest publications were with Universal Edition in London, and included Carol Jazz — improvisations on Christmas tunes — and Sing'n'Swing, for choir, piano and percussion.

Boosey & Hawkes signed Norton in 1983, and the first of the Microjazz series appeared, an educational music series that has expanded over 30 years to include music for all of the major instruments with piano, ensemble books, backing tracks and midi-file backings. As of 2015 it ranked as the biggest selling music series for Boosey & Hawkes, with well over a million sales to that date. Boosey & Hawkes claims that it is "one of the most widely used educational series ever published."

Norton's other publications with Boosey & Hawkes include the Essential Guides to Pop, Latin and Jazz Styles, the Rock, Country, Latin and Jazz Preludes series, and the Christopher Norton Concert Collections. Other recently published works include a CD-ROM, So You Wanna Be a Pop Star, tutors for electronic keyboard and guitar, and a volume in Boosey & Hawkes' Buy A Band range. In 2006, Norton gave a microjazz workshop at the Royal Irish Academy of Music in Dublin; he has also held workshops in Australia and New Zealand, Canada and the United States, the Netherlands, Spain, Germany, Malaysia, and Singapore.

In 2007, Frederick Harris Music published Christopher Norton Connections for Piano, a collection of 180 new, original piano pieces in popular styles. The pieces are divided into graded books that correspond to the respective grade of other Frederick Harris Music publications, such as Celebration Series. According to the official website, this series is "ideal for students and teachers looking for a sound pedagogical supplement or alternative to the study of classical piano literature."

Norton has made production music albums for KPM and Cavendish Music. A recent venture with the Novus Via Music Group involves the creation of a piano series for North American students that offers traditional skills in the context of popular styles.
