= Fred Ford =

Fred Ford may refer to:

- Fred Ford (American football) (born 1938), former American football halfback
- Fred Ford (musician) (1930–1999), American blues/jazz artist composer/arranger and educator
- Fred Ford (footballer) (born 1916), former footballer and manager
- Fred Ford (programmer), video game programmer

== See also ==
- Frederick Ford (disambiguation)
- Ford (surname)
