= Fred Gibson =

Fred Gibson or Frederick Gibson may refer to:

- Fred L. Gibson (1874–1956), Associate Justice of the Montana Supreme Court
- Fred Gibson (soccer, born 1888) (1888–1952), South African footballer
- Frederick Gibson (footballer) (born 1907), English footballer
- Fred Gibson (cricketer) (1912–2013), Jamaican-born English cricketer
- Frederick E. Gibson (born 1935), Canadian judge
- Frederick Gibson (racing driver) (born 1936), retired Canadian dirt modified racing driver
- Fred Gibson (racing driver) (born 1941), former Australian racing driver and race team owner
- Fred Gibson (golfer) (born 1947), American golfer
- Fred Gibson (American football) (born 1981), former wide receiver and former basketball guard
- Frederick John Philip Gibson, known as Fred Again (born 1993), British singer, remixer, record producer

== See also ==
- Fred Gipson (1908–1973), American author
