= Fred Cone =

Fred Cone may refer to:

- Fred Cone (baseball) (1848–1909), American baseball player
- Fred Cone (American football) (1926–2021), American football player
- Fred P. Cone (1871–1948), American politician
