= Fred Kelly (ice hockey) =

Canadian ice hockey player

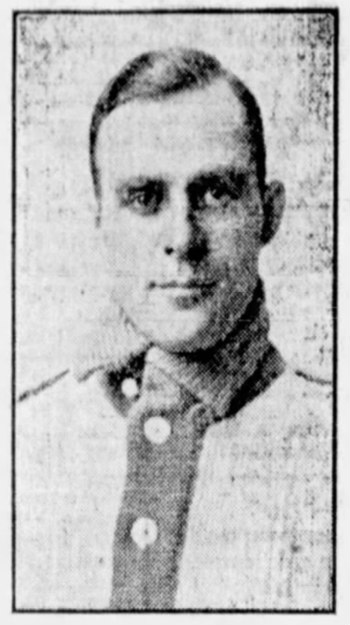
- Kelly with the Saskatoon Pilgrims.
- Born: June 14, 1887 Arnprior, Ontario, Canada
- Died: May 31, 1974 (aged 86) Calgary, Alberta, Canada
- Weight: 158 lb (72 kg; 11 st 4 lb)
- Position: Centre
- Played for: Arnprior Shamrocks; Montreal Stars; Montreal Shamrocks; Grand-Mère HC; Winnipeg Victorias; Saskatoon Pilgrims; Saskatoon Quakers; Vancouver Millionaires; Calgary Columbus Club
- Playing career: 1909–1920

Charles Frederick "King" Kelly (June 14, 1887 – May 31, 1974) was a Canadian amateur and professional ice hockey centre forward, primarily active during the 1910s. He played four games for the Vancouver Millionaires of the Pacific Coast Hockey Association during the 1919 season. Kelly's career span over six provinces across Canada as he played in Ontario, Québec, Manitoba, Saskatchewan, British Columbia and Alberta.

He died in Calgary on May 31, 1974, at an age of 86.

== Career ==
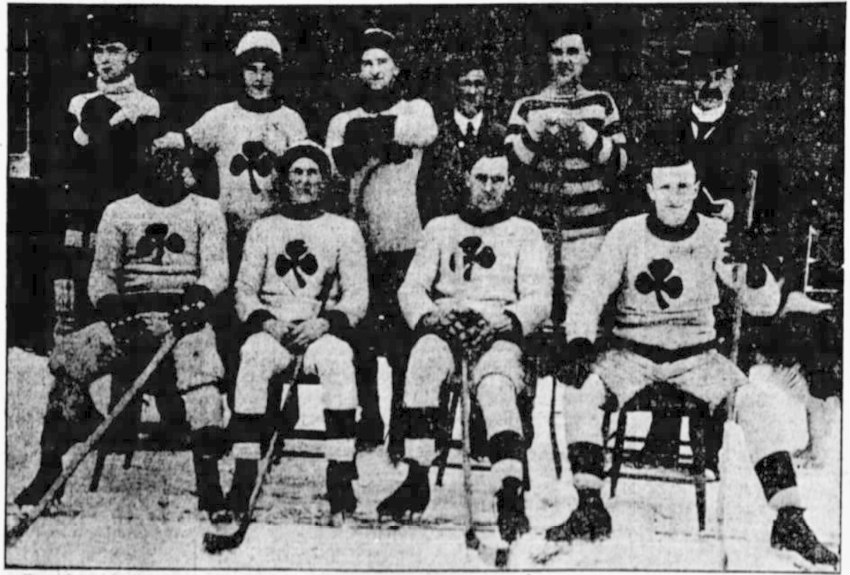
Arnprior Shamrocks in 1909–10. Kelly is seated second from right in the front row.

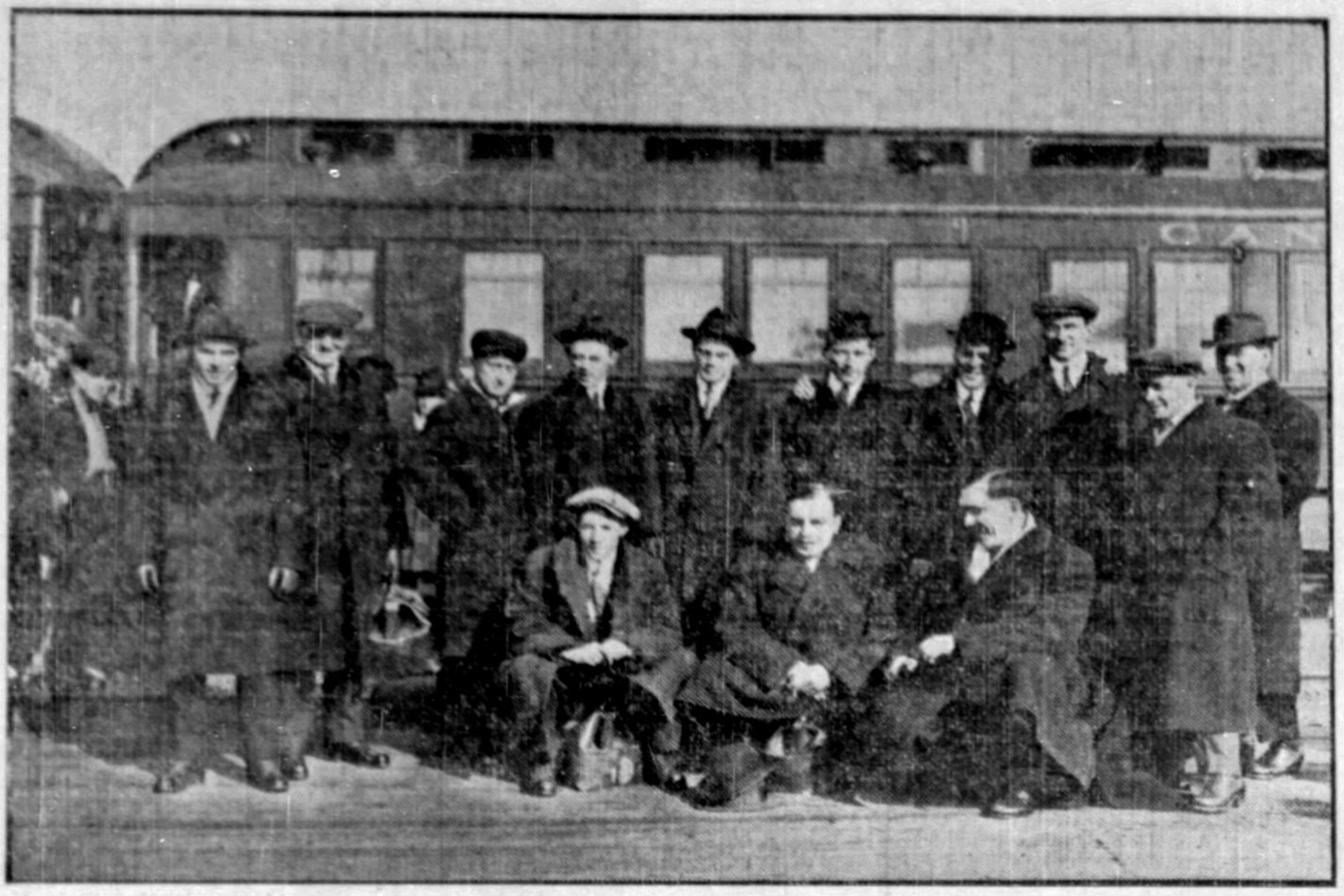
Grand-Mère Hockey Club in 1914 on its way to challenge for the Allan Cup. Kelly is standing fourth from the right.

Kelly began his career in his home town of Arnprior where he represented the Arnprior Shamrocks in the Upper Ottawa Valley Hockey League (UOVHL). Arnprior Shamrocks claimed the 1910 UOVHL championship title on March 16, 1910, by defeating the Pembroke Hockey Club 3 goals to 2 in Renfrew and Kelly scored two of the goals for Arnprior, including the game winning 3-2 goal in the second half of the game.

Kelly played in Montreal during the 1910–11 and 1911–12 seasons, in the city league and in the Interprovincial Amateur Hockey Union (IPAHU), with the Montreal Stars and the Montreal Shamrocks, and during the 1911–12 season his younger brother Ernie Kelly joined him playing on the Stars and the Shamrocks.

In 1912–13 and 1913–14 Kelly played for the Grand-Mère HC from Grand-Mère in Québec, in the IPAHU. Grand-Mère HC won the IPAHU championship both in 1913 and 1914. In 1913 Grand-Mère HC won league honors by defeating the Ottawa New Edinburghs in the final 7 goals to 4 over two games (7-1, 0-3), and in 1914 the club again emerged victorious in the IPAHU and challenged the Regina Victorias for the Allan Cup, but the Victorias held on to the Allan Cup by defeating Grand-Mère 10 goals to 5 over two games (6-4, 4-1) on home ice in Regina.

Kelly joined the Winnipeg Victorias in the Winnipeg Amateur Hockey League for the 1914–15 season, but mostly appeared as a spare player during the season behind Alex Romeril. He did start a league game at his natural centre forward position on January 21, 1915, against the Winnipeg Hockey Club, a game which the Victorias won 11 games to 5, with Kelly scoring a goal off of Percy Galbraith's skate.

The three following seasons, between 1915 and 1918, Kelly played hockey in Saskatoon (with the Saskatoon Pilgrims and the Saskatoon Quakers) where he was a prolific scorer. The March 5, 1917, issue of the Saskatoon Daily Star concluded that Kelly had not lost his speed from his Grand-Mère days and that he had also added more cunningness to his game, and that he had a "flip" shot that caused disruption for the opposing goaltenders.

=== PCHA stint and Big-4 League ===
Frank Patrick of the Vancouver Millionaires of the PCHA signed Kelly from the Vancouver Shipyards Coughlans well into the 1919 season, on January 31, and used him as a spare player for the rest of the regular season. Kelly was given sweater #10 with the Millionaires, but he did not score any goals for the club.

Kelly joined the Calgary Columbus Club of the Alberta Big-4 Hockey League for the 1919–20 season, where he became a teammate of Mickey MacKay who had also starred on the 1919 Vancouver Millionaires in the PCHA. While not playing hockey with the Columbus Club Kelly worked as an insurance adjuster.

After his playing career was over Kelly stayed in Calgary, and in the 1930s he acted both as a hockey coach and as a referee in the city. In 1935–36 he coached the Calgary Rangers of the Alberta Senior Hockey League.
