= Fred Barker (footballer) =

Australian rules footballer (1903–1974)

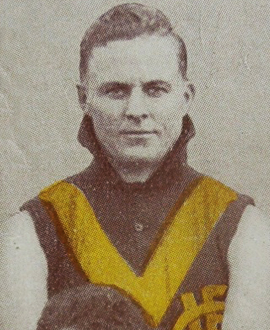
- Barker, between 1927 and 1929

Personal information
- Full name: Frederick John Austin Barker
- Born: 31 October 1903; Clifton Hill, Victoria
- Died: 6 May 1974 (aged 70); Ivanhoe, Victoria
- Original team: Fairfield
- Height: 173 cm (5 ft 8 in)
- Weight: 68 kg (150 lb)

Playing career^{1}
Years	Club	Games (Goals)
1925–26	Collingwood	2 (0)
1927–29	Hawthorn	29 (3)
Total		31 (3)
- ^{1} Playing statistics correct to the end of 1929.

Frederick John Austin Barker (31 October 1903 – 6 May 1974) was an Australian rules footballer who played with Collingwood and Hawthorn in the Victorian Football League (VFL).

== Family ==
The second child born to Frederick Barker (1873–1929) and Emily Millicent Austin (1873–1926), Frederick John Austin Barker was born at Collingwood on 31 October 1903.

He was the nephew of VFL players George Barker (Essendon) and Syd Barker Sr. (Richmond, North Melbourne, Essendon).

== Football ==
=== Collingwood ===
Originally from Fairfield, Fred Barker made his senior debut playing at full back for Collingwood in the Round 17 1925 match against South Melbourne, wearing the number 3 guernsey. He made his second appearance in 1926 against Melbourne in Round 4, this time playing on the wing.

=== Melbourne ===
In June 1926 he was cleared to Melbourne and although he played for their reserves he did not manage a senior appearance.

=== Hawthorn ===
Barker transferred to Hawthorn at the start of the 1927 VFL season and he played in their Round 1 loss to St Kilda but was injured and missed the next few weeks. He then played consistently from Round 6 through until Round 1 of the 1929 VFL season which was his last senior game for Hawthorn. He was demoted to the reserves from Round 2 and played out the year in the VFL reserves competition.

== World War II ==
Barker enlisted to serve in the Australian Army in September 1942 and served until the end of 1944.

== Later life ==
Fred Barker married Ruby Jean Allison (1907–1995) in 1930 and they lived in Ivanhoe throughout their married life.

Fred Barker died at their Ivanhoe home on 6 May 1974 and was cremated at Springvale Botanical Cemetery.
