= Fred Wilcox =

Fred Wilcox may refer to:

- Fred M. Wilcox (director) (1907–1964), American film director
- Fred M. Wilcox (South Dakota politician) (1858–?), South Dakota state senator
- Fred M. Wilcox (Wisconsin politician) (1870–1944), Wisconsin state senator
- Fred A. Wilcox, American writer
- Fred Wilcox (footballer) (1922–2015), English footballer (Chester FC)

== See also ==
- Freddie Wilcox (1881–1958), English footballer
- Freddy Willcox, English footballer (Cheltenham Town FC)
