= Fred Gallagher =

Fred Gallagher may refer to:

- Fred Gallagher (cartoonist) (born 1968), American illustrator and web cartoonist
- Fred Gallagher (co-driver) (born 1952), World Rally Championship winning co-driver from Northern Ireland
- Fred Gallagher (footballer) (1931–2025), Australian rules footballer
