= Fred Wright (researcher) =

- Education: Memphis State University; Georgia Institute of Technology
- Scientific career
- Fields: Cyber and electronic warfare systems
- Workplaces: Georgia Institute of Technology, Georgia Tech Research Institute

George A. "Fred" Wright is an American engineer who is the Associate Laboratory Director and Principal Research Engineer of the Cyber Technology and Information Security Laboratory (CTISL) at the Georgia Tech Research Institute. In 2008, Wright founded a cyber security incubator, which led to the formation of CTISL in 2010. The Lab focuses on development and integration of security technologies into Government and industry enterprises. His research has focused in a variety of technical areas, including cyber security, electronic warfare, communications systems, signal processing, signals intelligence, and radar systems. Wright is also an adjunct professor of computer science at Georgia Institute of Technology.

== Education ==
Wright holds a B.S. in electrical engineering from Memphis State University earned in 1986, and an M.S. and PhD in electrical engineering, both from Georgia Tech, awarded in 1987 and 1996, respectively.

== Career ==
Wright joined GTRI as a research engineer in the Electronic Systems Laboratory in 1987. Prior to the creation of the Cyber Technology and Information Security Laboratory (CTISL), where he was named deputy director and chief engineer, Wright was chief engineer of ELSYS.
