= Fred Ainsworth =

English footballer

Personal information
- Date of birth: 29 June 1894
- Place of birth: Loughborough, England
- Date of death: 1981 (aged 86–87)
- Position: Forward

Senior career*
Years	Team	Apps	(Gls)
- Loughborough
1919	Derby County	1	(0)
- * Club domestic league appearances and goals

Fred Ainsworth (29 June 1894 – 1981) was an English footballer who played in The Football League for Derby County. He also played for Loughborough. He was born in Loughborough and died in 1981.
