= Fred Kaplan =

Fred Kaplan may refer to:

- Fred Kaplan (biographer) (born 1937), American biographer
- Fred Kaplan (bridge) American bridge player
- Fred Kaplan (journalist) (born 1954), American journalist who specializes in international affairs and jazz music

== See also ==
- Frederick Kaplan, American physician and medical researcher
- Fred H. Caplan (1914–2004), West Virginia Supreme Court Justice
