= Fred Moore (American soldier) =

American Army soldier and Tomb Sentinel

Fred Moore (born 1936) is a former US Army soldier and former member of the 3rd U.S. Infantry Regiment, best known as the prestigious "The Old Guard” or Honor Guard Company sentinel of Company E, 4th Battalion.

In March 1961 Moore was the first African American tomb guard for the Tomb of the Unknown Soldier (Arlington), a historic US monument at Arlington National Cemetery which honors the unidentified remains of three combatants from World War I, World War II and the Korean War. Moore’s achievement broke one of the US Army’s most historic color lines.

== Early life, family ==
Moore was born in 1936 in Cleveland, Ohio. He attended East Technical High School, graduating in 1956. Moore had three older brothers, all former members of the US military.

Moore worked at a supermarket before being drafted into the US Military.

Moore married Joyce Singleton-Moore, whom Moore met through his sister. They had two children, a son and a daughter.

== Military career ==
On Aug. 13, 1959, the Selective Service drafted Moore into the US Army. He volunteered for the 3rd U.S. Infantry Regiment, best known as the historic “The Old Guard” or Honor Guard sentinel.

Initially assigned to the reception center in Fort Knox, Kentucky, the 6-foot, 185-pound Moore received high scores during three days of initial training tests. Subsequently, an officer called Moore into his office and asked Moore if he would be interested in serving in the Honor Guard Company. The US Army assigned Moore to the 3rd U.S. Infantry Regiment, best known as the historic “The Old Guard” or Honor Guard sentinel. The US Army sent Moore to Fort Myer, Virginia for Honor Guard training. The company comprises an escort platoon, a casket platoon, a firing party and a continental color guard.

Assigned to the 3rd platoon Honor Guard Company as a Specialist 4th Class, Moore became a member of the firing team, which performed most of the burial rifle salutes at Arlington National Cemetery. He also served at various parades, official ceremonies, and receptions for visiting foreign dignitaries throughout Washington, DC, Virginia and Maryland.

Moore marched in President of the United States John F. Kennedy’s inauguration parade. He also had duty at Kennedy's inaugural ball.

=== Tomb of the Unknown Soldier ===
On March 13, 1961, Ghana President Kwame Nkrumah visited the United States. As a guest of President Kennedy, Nkrumah visited the Tomb of the Unknown Soldier (Arlington) with Kennedy, placing a wreath at the Tomb. Nkrumah questioned Kennedy why there were no soldiers of color as part of the tomb’s sentinel guard.

Soon after, the US Army assigned Moore to the Tomb of the Unknown Soldier guard platoon for sentinel training. The previously all-white Tomb Guard sentinel guards embraced him immediately. Though it is believed that President Kennedy had a role in Moore's assignment to the unit guarding the Tomb of the Unknown Soldier, it was US Army Colonel Neale Cosby, platoon leader of the Tomb Guard, who selected Moore. Nonetheless, President Kennedy and his defense secretary, McNamara, were sufficiently motivated to change the racial dynamic in the honor guard. After the wreath event with Nkrumah, McNamara asked his manpower assistant to introduce a reasonable number of African American personnel into the Old Guard ranks. Accordingly, orders traveled down the chain of command. Colonel Neale quickly moved Moore in sentinel position, though Moore was already in line for Tomb duty.

In March 1961, Moore performed his first walk as an official Tomb Guard sentinel, becoming the first African American to serve in this capacity and breaking a historic US Army color line. The Tomb has had a 24-hours-a-day, seven days a week military guard since July 1937.

Moore was unaware of his historic breaking of this color line until Ebony magazine featured Moore in a story in September 1961.

Moore served as a Tomb Sentinel from March 1961 to August 1961.

=== Post-sentinel duty ===
After completing Tomb duty in August 1961, Moore attended Noncommissioned Officers Academy, graduating with honors. After completing his two-year service requirement, Moore left the US Army and returned to Cleveland, Ohio.

=== Legacy ===
- Moore’s name is a test question on the Tomb Guard’s 100-question test to earn the Tomb Guard badge.
- In 1997, Army Sgt. Danyell E. Wilson became the first female African American Tomb Guard.

== Later years ==
After leaving the US Army, Moore returned to Cleveland, Ohio, working for Sherwin-Williams and later for Cuyahoga County in administration.

Moore currently resides in Cleveland.
