= Frederic J. Brown II =

U.S. Army lieutenant general

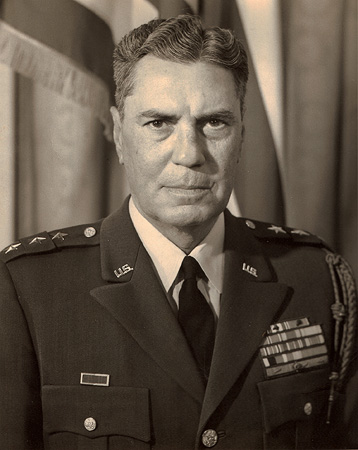
- Brown as commander of Sixth United States Army, circa 1963
- Born: July 9, 1905; Britton, South Dakota, US
- Died: March 13, 1971 (aged 65); Washington, D.C., US
- Burial place: Arlington National Cemetery
- Spouse: Mary Kathryn Richardson (m. 1927)
- Children: Frederic J. Brown III
- Military career
- Allegiance: United States
- Branch: United States Army
- Service years: 1927–1967
- Rank: Lieutenant General
- Nickname: Ted
- Service number: 016761
- Commands: Army Logistics Systems Study Group; Sixth United States Army; Allied Land Forces South-Eastern Europe; V Corps; 3rd Armored Division; 3rd Armored Division Artillery; 54th Armored Field Artillery Battalion
- Conflicts: World War II: Battle of Mortain; Battle of Falaise; Battle of the Bulge; Battle of Remagen; Ruhr pocket; Harz Mountains; Occupation of Germany
- Awards: Army Distinguished Service Medal (2); Silver Star (2); Legion of Merit (2); Bronze Star Medal; Air Medal
- Other work: President, U.S. Armor Association

Frederic J. Brown II (July 9, 1905 – March 13, 1971) was a career officer in the United States Army. A veteran of World War II, he was most notable for serving in senior command assignments, including the 3rd Armored Division, V Corps, Allied Land Forces South-Eastern Europe, Sixth United States Army, and the Army Logistics Systems Study Group. Brown attained the rank of lieutenant general and was a recipient of two awards of the Army Distinguished Service Medal, two awards of the Silver Star, two awards of the Legion of Merit, the Bronze Star Medal, and the Air Medal.

== Early life ==
Frederic Joseph Brown was born in Britton, South Dakota, on July 9, 1905, the son of Frederic Jacob Brown (1870–1954) and Adah Eunice (James) Brown (1874–1963). He attended the schools of Britton, and graduated from Britton High School in 1923. Brown received an appointment to the United States Military Academy (West Point) from U.S. Representative Royal C. Johnson. He graduated in 1927 and received his commission as a second lieutenant of Field Artillery.

== Early career ==
After receiving his commission, Brown was assigned to the 6th Field Artillery Regiment, which he joined just as it was completing the transition from horse-drawn to mechanized. In 1928, Brown married Mary Kathryn Richardson, a high school classmate. They were the parents of a son, Frederic J. Brown III.

Brown completed the Field Artillery Battery Officer Course in 1933 and the Advanced Motorized Artillery Course in 1935. He was a member of the West Point faculty from 1936 to 1941, and was assigned to teach physics.

== Continued career ==
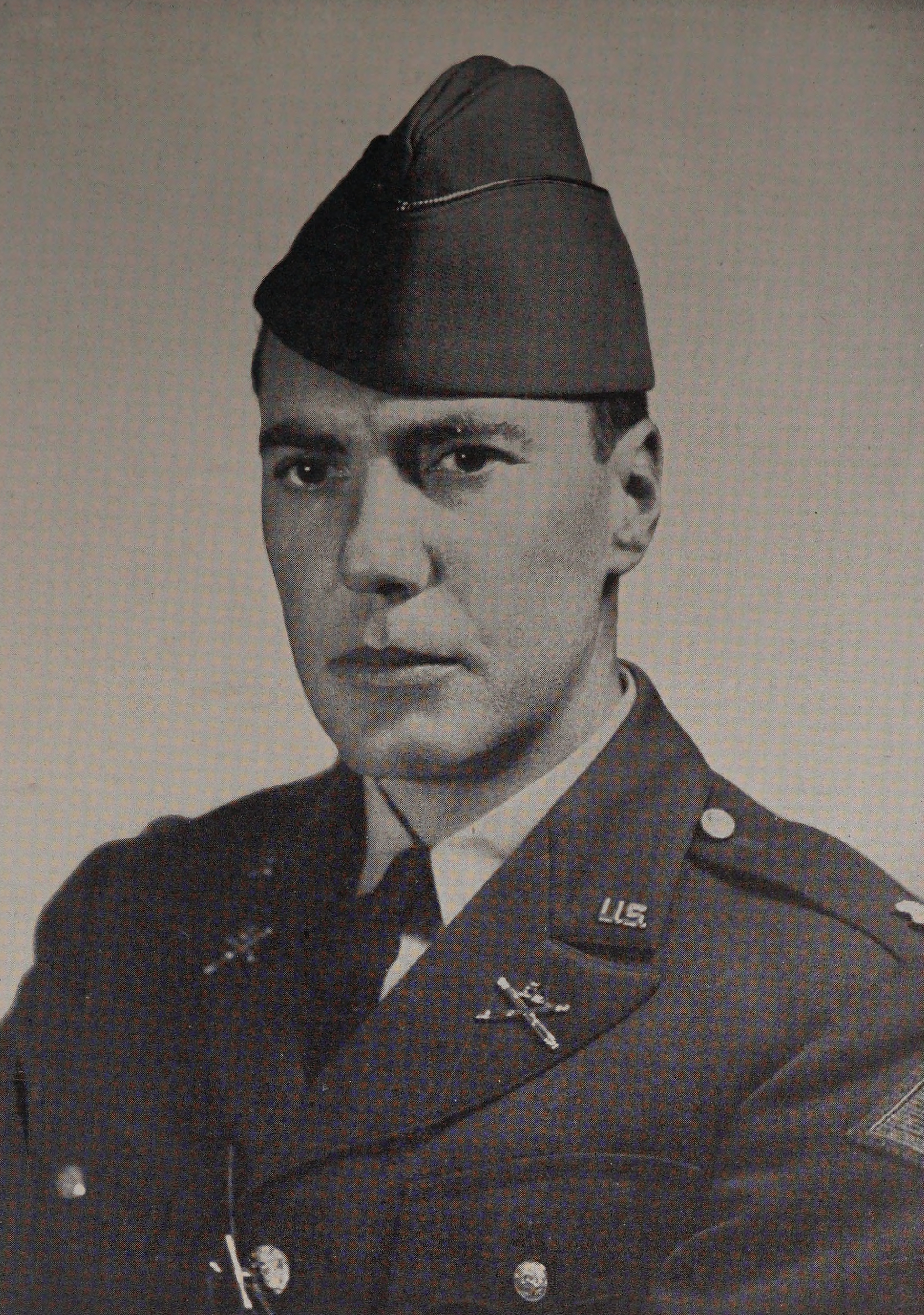
Brown II as 54th Armored Field Artillery Battalion commander c. 1942

At the start of World War II, Brown was assigned to command the 54th Armored Artillery Battalion, a unit of the 3rd Infantry Division. In September 1942 he was assigned to command the 3rd Infantry Division Artillery, which he led throughout combat in France and Germany. Battles in which he participated included the Battle of Mortain, Battle of Falaise, Battle of the Bulge, Battle of Remagen, Ruhr pocket, and the Harz Mountains. After Germany's surrender, Brown participated in the Occupation of Germany.

Brown attended the National War College from 1946 to 1947. After graduating, he remained at the school as a member of the faculty. From 1950 to 1953, he was assigned to United States European Command (EUCOM) as assistant chief of staff for operations and training (G-3). He was promoted to brigadier general in 1952, and remained at EUCOM as deputy chief of staff for operations. In 1955, he returned to the United States and carried out several staff assignments in the office of the army's deputy chief of staff for logistics (G-4). In 1958, he was assigned as EUCOM's chief of staff as a major general.

== Later career ==
From July 1959 to October 1960, Brown commanded 3rd Armored Division, then headquartered in Frankfurt. As a lieutenant general, he commanded V Corps from October 1960 to August 1961, which was also headquartered in Frankfurt. From September 1961 to July 1963, he commanded Allied Land Forces South-Eastern Europe, headquartered in İzmir, Turkey. From August 1963 to July 1965, Brown commanded Sixth United States Army, then headquartered at the Presidio of San Francisco.

Brown retired in 1965, but was immediately recalled to active duty to serve as president of the Army Logistics Systems Study Group (the Brown Board), which studied and made recommendations for improving the army's processes for procuring and distributing supplies and equipment. From 1965 to 1966, he served as president of the United States Armor Association. He retired for the second time in May 1967. Brown's awards and decorations included the Army Distinguished Service Medal with oak leaf cluster, Silver Star with oak leaf cluster, Legion of Merit with oak leaf cluster, Bronze Star Medal, and Air Medal.

In addition to his U.S. awards, Brown was the recipient of several foreign decorations for his World War II service, including the French Legion of Honor (Chevalier) and Croix de Guerre with palm. In addition, he received the Belgian Croix de Guerre with palm, Order of Leopold II (Officer), and Fourragère.

In retirement, Brown resided in McLean, Virginia. He died at Walter Reed Army Medical Center in Washington, D.C., on March 13, 1971. Brown was buried at Arlington National Cemetery.
