= Frederic J. Brown III =

U.S. Army lieutenant general (1934–2024)

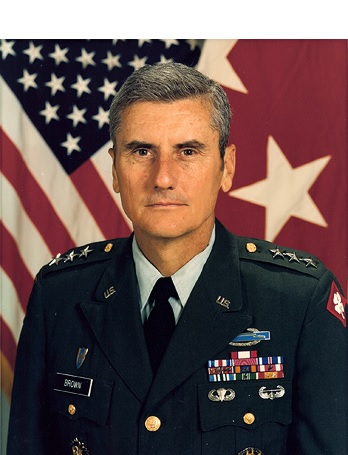
- Brown as commander of Fourth U.S. Army in 1986
- Born: July 18, 1934; Fort Sill, Oklahoma, U.S.
- Died: May 15, 2024 (aged 89); Washington D.C., U.S.
- Education: United States Military Academy (BS, 1956); Graduate Institute of International and Development Studies (MA, 1963; PhD, 1967)
- Spouse: Harriette Anne Upham (m. 1956–2018, her death)
- Military career
- Allegiance: United States
- Branch: United States Army
- Service years: 1956–1989
- Rank: Lieutenant general
- Nickname: Rick
- Service number: 0733622
- Commands: Fourth United States Army; Chief of Armor and Cavalry; 1st Brigade, 2nd Armored Division; Headquarters Command/Eagle Support Brigade, 101st Airborne Division
- Conflicts: Vietnam War
- Awards: Army Distinguished Service Medal (2); Silver Star; Legion of Merit; Distinguished Flying Cross; Bronze Star Medal (6)
- Other work: Author; Consultant, Institute for Defense Analyses; Consultant, United States Department of Defense

Frederic J. Brown III (July 18, 1934 – May 15, 2024) was a United States Army officer. A veteran of the Vietnam War, he attained the rank of lieutenant general and was a recipient of the Army Distinguished Service Medal (2), Silver Star, Legion of Merit, Distinguished Flying Cross, and multiple awards of the Bronze Star Medal. Brown is best known for his service as Chief of Armor and Cavalry from 1983 to 1986 and command of Fourth United States Army from 1986 to 1989.

== Early life ==
Frederic Joseph Brown III was born at Fort Sill, Oklahoma on July 18, 1934, the son of Lieutenant General Frederic J. Brown II (1905–1971) and Kathryn (Richardson) Brown (1903–1988). He attended schools on various United States Army bases and Western High School (Washington, D.C.), and is a graduate of Heidelberg High School.

Brown's parents were natives of South Dakota, and in 1952 Brown was appointed to the United States Military Academy (West Point) by Karl Mundt, one of South Dakota's U.S. Senators. He graduated from West Point in 1956 and was commissioned as a second lieutenant of Armor.

== Start of career ==
After receiving his commission and completing his initial training, Brown served with 1st Battalion, 33rd Armor Regiment in West Germany from March 1957 to December 1959, including assignments as a platoon leader, battalion staff officer, and company commander. From December 1959 to June 1960, he studied French and German at the Army Language School. From June 1960 to June 1961, Brown attended the Armor Officer Career Course at Fort Knox.

From June 1961 to June 1963, Brown was an Olmsted Scholar at the Graduate Institute of International and Development Studies in Geneva, Switzerland, from which he graduated with a Master of Arts degree in Political Science. During his studies, Brown performed temporary duty as a member of the U.S. delegation to the Laos Conference (1961), and an observer/assistant operations officer (S-3) during maneuvers of the 12th German Armor Brigade (1962) and 5th Swiss Mountain Ski Regiment (1963).

Brown served as an assistant professor of Political Science and International Relations at West Point from June 1963 to August 1966. From August to December 1966, he performed Vietnam War duty as plans officer (G-3) on the staff of the 1st Infantry Division. He then served as operations officer (S-3) on the staff of the division's 2nd Battalion, 2nd Infantry Regiment. In 1967, he received his Doctor of Philosophy degree in International Relations from the Graduate Institute. He returned to the United States in August 1967 and was assigned as a student at the Armed Forces Staff College (AFSC), from which he graduated in June 1968.

== Continued career ==
After completing the AFSC course, Brown was assigned to the Joint Staff as executive officer and special assistant to the chairman for counterinsurgency and special activities. From January to June 1969 he served on the staff of the Vice Chief of Staff of the United States Army. From June to December 1969, Brown served again in Vietnam, this time as operations and training officer (G-3) of the 1st Infantry Division. From December 1969 to April 1970 he commanded 1st Squadron, 4th Cavalry Regiment.

Upon returning from Vietnam, Brown served from April 1970 to August 1971 as coordinator of army studies on the staff of the Army's Assistant Vice Chief of Staff. From August 1971 to June 1972 he was a student at the National War College. From June 1972 to January 1973, he served as military assistant to Alexander Haig during Haig's appointment as Deputy Assistant to the President for National Security Affairs. When Haig was assigned as the army's Vice Chief of Staff from January to May 1973, Brown served on his staff as a special assistant. When Haig was appointed White House Chief of Staff in May 1973, Brown served temporarily as his military assistant.

== Later career ==
From July 1973 to January 1974, Brown was assigned as deputy commander of 1st Brigade, 101st Airborne Division. From January to June 1974, he served as assistant chief of staff for personnel (G-1) on the staff of the 101st Airborne. From June 1974 to January 1975, he commanded the division's Headquarters Command/Eagle Support Brigade.

From 1978 to 1981, Brown served as assistant division commander of the 8th Infantry Division in West Germany. From 1981 to 1982, he was assigned as deputy chief of staff for training at the United States Army Training and Doctrine Command. During this posting, Brown oversaw the creation of the Fort Irwin National Training Center. From 1983 to 1986, he commanded the U.S. Army Armor Center as the Chief of Armor and Cavalry. As the leader of the Armor branch, Brown was credited by the United States Secretary of the Army with modernizing the armored force and seeing his concepts validated by its performance during 1991's Gulf War.

Brown commanded Fourth United States Army at Fort Sheridan, Illinois, from 1986 to until his retirement in 1989. In retirement, he was a resident of McLean, Virginia, and Dillon, Colorado. After his military retirement, he worked on military knowledge management and digitization efforts as a consultant for the Institute for Defense Analyses and the United States Department of Defense.

From 2003 to 2006, Brown was senior mentor for the army team that fielded the Battle Command Knowledge System. From 2006 to 2009, he was the senior mentor for the commander of United States European Command during the creation and fielding of a combined information management/knowledge management system. Brown was also an author on military topics, and his published works included Rebuilding America's Army, America's Army – A Model for Interagency Effectiveness, The United States Army in Transition, The US Army in Transition II: Land Power in the Information Age, and Chemical Warfare: A Study in Restraints.

== Personal life and death ==
On July 7, 1956, Brown married Harriette Anne Upham (1934–2018), the daughter of Major General John S. Upham Jr. and Harriette (Lawrence) Upham. They were the parents of three daughters, Kathryn, Harriette, and Judith.

Brown died in Washington D.C. on May 15, 2024, at the age of 89.

== Awards ==
In 2010, the West Point Alumni Association named Brown as a distinguished graduate. Brown was a recipient of the Combat Infantryman Badge, Air Assault Badge, Parachutist Badge, Joint Staff Identification Badge, and Army Staff Identification Badge. He received the Gallantry Cross with palm and Civil Actions Medal as unit awards from South Vietnam.

The awards and decorations Brown received during his career included the Army Distinguished Service Medal with oak leaf cluster, Silver Star, Legion of Merit, Distinguished Flying Cross, Bronze Star Medal with "V" device and five oak leaf clusters, Meritorious Service Medal with oak leaf cluster, Air Medal with numeral 24, Joint Service Commendation Medal, Army Commendation Medal with oak leaf cluster, and South Vietnamese Gallantry Cross with silver star and bronze star.
