= Fred Atkinson (educator) =

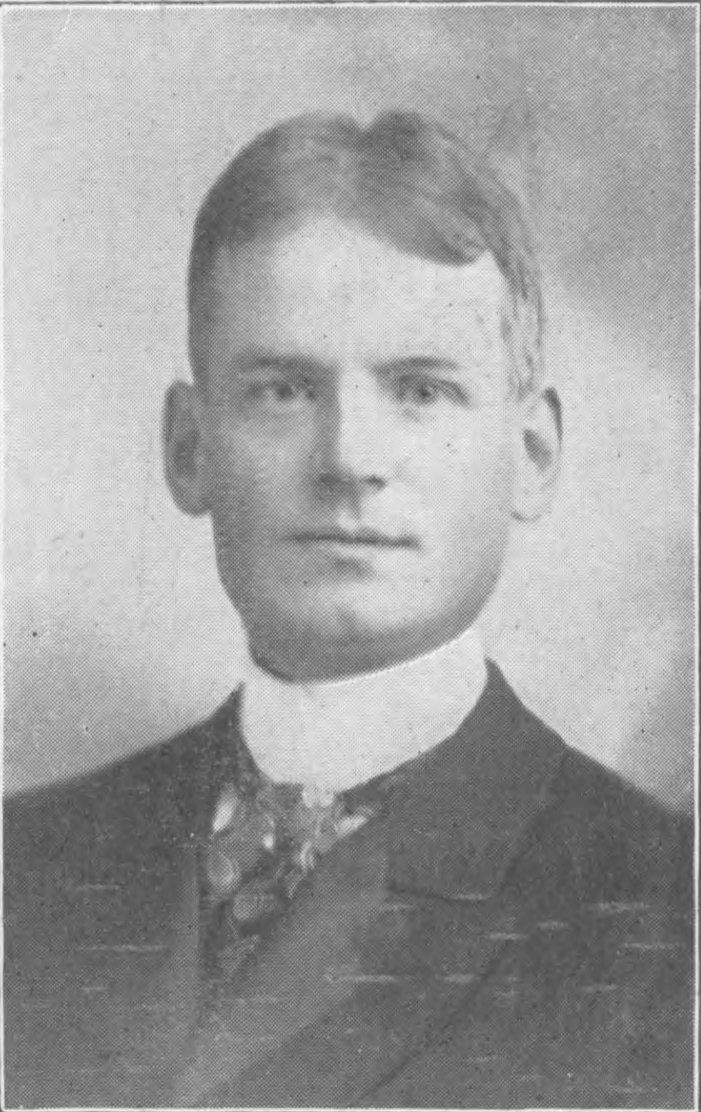
- Born: 23 May 1865; Reading
- Died: 20 October 1941 (aged 76); Tucson
- Alma mater: Harvard University; University of Jena; Sorbonne
- Occupation: Writer, educator
- Employer: Polytechnic Institute of Brooklyn

Fred Washington Atkinson (May 23, 1865 – October 21, 1941) was an American educator and administrator. He served as general superintendent of education in the Philippines during the United States colonial period (1900–1903) and president of the Polytechnic Institute of Brooklyn (1904–1925). During his time, he gave emphasis in providing Filipinos with vocational training.

== Biography ==
Atkinson was born on May 23, 1865, in Reading, Massachusetts. He received his B.A. at Harvard College in 1890, and was married the same year to Winnifred G. Whitford in Waltham, Massachusetts. Atkinson then studied at Berlin, Halle, Leipzig, and Jena Universities, as well as the Sorbonne in Paris. He earned his Ph.D. at the University of Leipzig in 1893. Atkinson died in Tucson, Arizona on October 21, 1941, at the age of 76.
