= Fred Hunt =

Fred Hunt may refer to:

- Fred Hunt (1917–1977), Canadian ice hockey player
- Fred Hunt (1923–1986), English jazz pianist

== See also ==
- Freddie Hunt (born 1987), British racing driver
- Frederick Hunt (disambiguation)
