= Fred Atkinson (footballer) =

English footballer (1919–1991)

Personal information
- Full name: Frederick James Atkinson
- Date of birth: 24 August 1919
- Place of birth: Newcastle upon Tyne, England
- Date of death: July 1991 (aged 71)
- Place of death: Newcastle upon Tyne, England
- Position: Wing half

Senior career*
Years	Team	Apps	(Gls)
1945–1949	Gateshead	32	(5)
- * Club domestic league appearances and goals

Frederick James Atkinson (24 August 1919 – July 1991) was an English footballer who played as a wing half.

Atkinson played his entire career for Gateshead, originally signing in December 1945. He scored a total of 7 goals in 39 appearances in the league and FA Cup.

== Sources ==
- "allfootballers.com".
