= Rosen (surname) =

- Language: German

Origin
- Meaning: roses

Rosen is a surname of German and Ashkenazi Jewish origin, the name deriving from the German word for roses. Notable people with this surname include:

== A–H ==
- Adam Rosen (1984–2021), American-born British luger Olympian
- Al Rosen (1924–2015), American All Star and MVP baseball player
- Al Rosen (actor) (1910–1990), American actor in Cheers
- Alan Rosen (1943–2013), American sports collectibles dealer
- Alan Rosen (restaurant owner) (born 1969), American restaurant owner and author
- Albert Rosen (1924–1997), Austrian-born Czech/Irish-naturalised conductor
- Andrea Rosen (born 1974), American comedian and actress
- Andy Rosen (also known as Goat), American musician
- Anton Rosen (1859–1928), Danish architect
- Beatrice Rosen (born 1984), French-American actress
- Billy Rosen (1928–2019), American bridge player
- Carl Gustaf von Rosen (1909–1977), Swedish pioneer aviator
- Charles Rosen (1927–2012), American pianist and author
- Charles Rosen (scientist) (1917–2002), Canadian artificial intelligence researcher
- Charley Rosen (1941–2025), American basketball coach and sports writer
- Conrad von Rosen (1628–1715), Marshal of the French Army
- David Rosen (artist) (1959–2014), South African artist and fashion designer
- David Rosen (businessman) (1930–2025), American businessman
- David Rosen (entomologist) (1936–1997), Israeli entomologist
- David Rosen (literary scholar) (born 1971), American literary scholar
- David Rosen (musicologist) (born 1938), professor of musicology at Cornell University
- David Rosen (politics), American political fundraiser
- David Rosen (rabbi) (born 1951), English-Israeli rabbi
- David M. Rosen (born 1944), American anthropologist
- Donn Eric Rosen, (1929–1986) American ichthyologist
- Eliyahu Chaim Rosen (1899–1984), Polish-born rabbi in Ukraine
- Eric S. Rosen (born 1953), Kansas Supreme Court Justice
- Eric Rosen (playwright) (born 1970), American theater director and playwright
- Eric Rosen (chess player) (born 1993), American chess player and streamer
- Eunice Rosen (1930–2019), American bridge player
- Frank Rosen (1918–1998), South African artist
- Fred Rosen (author), true crime author and former columnist for The New York Times
- Fred Rosen (businessman), former CEO of Ticketmaster, co-founder of the Bel Air Homeowners Alliance
- Fred Rosen (physician) (1930–2005), American medical researcher
- Freda Rosen (1945–2007), American playwright and political activist
- Friedrich Rosen (1856–1935), German Orientalist, diplomat and politician
- Gerald E. Rosen (born 1951), American judge
- Gerald H. Rosen (born 1933), American theoretical physicist
- Goody Rosen (1912–1994), Canadian major league baseball player
- Gustaf-Fredrik von Rosen (1895–1956), Swedish officer and murderer
- Harold Rosen (electrical engineer) (1926–2017), American electrical engineer
- Harris Rosen (1939–2024), American hotelier and philanthropist
- Harry Rosen (1931–2023), Canadian businessman
- Harvey Rosen (1949–2022), Canadian mayor
- Herb Rosen, founder of Skippers Seafood & Chowder House
- Hilary Rosen (born 1958), former chief executive of the RIAA

== J–Z ==
- Jack Rosen (born 1949), chairman of the American Jewish Congress
- Jacky Rosen (born 1957), American politician
- James Rosen (author), American journalist
- James Rosen (journalist) (born 1968), American journalist
- James Rosen (jurist) (1909–1972), American judge
- Jay Rosen (born 1956), American journalism professor
- Jay Rosen (drummer) (born 1961), American musician
- Jeffrey Rosen (businessman), American businessman
- Jeffrey Rosen (legal academic) (born 1964), American academic
- Jelka Rosen (1868–1935), Serbian painter
- Jeremy Rosen (born 1942), British-born Orthodox rabbi
- John Rosen, Canadian criminal defence lawyer
- Joseph Rosen (1858–1936), Belarusian rabbi and talmudist
- Joseph A. Rosen (1877–1949), American agronomist
- Josh Rosen (born 1997), American football player
- Kelly Rosen (born 1995), Estonian footballer
- Larry Rosen (executive), Canadian retail chief executive officer
- Lawrence Rosen (anthropologist) (born 1941), American anthropologist
- Lawrence Rosen (attorney), American attorney and computer specialist
- Leo Rosen, American cryptoanalyst
- Leonard Rosen (1930–2014), American attorney
- Louis Rosen (1918–2009), nuclear physicist
- Magnus Rosén (born 1963), Swedish musician
- Marion Rosen (1914–2012), German-American physiotherapist
- Mel Rosen (1928–2018), American track coach
- Martin Rosen (director), British film director
- Michael Rosen (born 1946), English poet and broadcaster
- Michel de Rosen (born 1951), American businessman
- Milton Rosen (1915–2014), American engineer
- Moishe Rosen (1932–2010), founder of Jews for Jesus
- Moses Rosen (1912–1994), Chief Rabbi of Romania
- Nancy Rosen, U.S. sculptor
- Nathan Rosen (1909–1995), Israeli physicist
- Nir Rosen (born 1977), American journalist
- Paul Rosen (born 1960), Canadian sledge hockey goalie
- Phil Rosen (1888–1951), American film director and cinematographer
- Pinchas Rosen (1887–1978), Israeli founder, statesman and lawyer
- Rachel Rosen (born 1993), American physicist
- Rich Rosen (born 1956), software developer
- Robert Rosén (born 1987), Swedish ice hockey player
- Robert Rosen (biologist) (1934–1998), American theoretical biologist
- Robert Rosen (photographer) (born 1953), Australian photographer
- Robert Rosen (writer) (born 1952), American writer
- Roman Rosen (1849–1921), Russian diplomat
- Sam Rosen (actor), American actor and writer
- Sam Rosen (comics) (1922–1992), American comic book letterer
- Sam Rosen (sportscaster) (born 1947), American sportscaster
- Selina Rosen (born 1960), American author
- Shabtai Rosenne (1917–2010), UK-born Israeli professor and diplomat
- Shlomo Rosen (1905–1985), Israeli politician and minister
- Sherwin Rosen (1938–2001), American labor economist
- Shlomo Sorin Rosen (born 1978), Prime Rabbi of Romania
- Stan Rosen (1906–1984), American NFL football player
- Stanley Rosen (1929–2014), American philosopher
- Stephen Peter Rosen, professor of national security and military affairs
- Steve J. Rosen (1942–2024), American lobbyist
- Steven A. Rosen (born 1954), archaeologist
- Steven J. Rosen (born 1955), American author
- Steven M. Rosen (born 1942), Canadian psychologist and philosopher
- Steven T. Rosen, American oncologist
- Zack Rosen (born 1989), American basketball player

== See also ==
- Roesen, a surname
- Rosén, a surname
- Rozov, a surname
