= Rosen =

Rosen is a surname of German and Ashkenazi Jewish origin, the name deriving from the German word for roses. It may also refer to:

== Places ==
- Rosen, Burgas Province, Bulgaria
- Rosen, Dobrich Province, Bulgaria
- Rosen, Minnesota, unincorporated community, United States

== Companies ==
- Rosen Publishing, an American publisher

== People ==
=== A–H ===
- Adam Rosen (1984-2021), American-born British luger Olympian
- Al Rosen (1924–2015), American All Star and MVP baseball player
- Al Rosen (actor) (1910–1990), American actor in Cheers
- Alan Rosen (restaurant owner) (born 1969), American restaurant and bakery owner, and author
- Albert Rosen (1924–1997), conductor
- Andrea Rosen (born 1974), American comedian and actress
- Andy Rosen, American musician
- Anton Rosen (1859–1928), Danish architect
- Barry P. Rosen (born 1944), American scientist
- Beatrice Rosen (born 1984), French-American actress
- Benjamin M. Rosen (1933–2026), American businessman
- Carl Gustaf von Rosen (1909–1977), Swedish pioneer aviator
- Charles Rosen (1927–2012), American pianist and author
- Charles Rosen (scientist) (1917–2002), Canadian artificial intelligence researcher
- Charley Rosen (1941–2025), American basketball coach and sports writer
- Conrad von Rosen (1628–1715), Marshal of the French Army
- David Rosen (disambiguation), several people, including:
  - David Rosen (artist) (1959–2014), South African artist and fashion designer
  - David Rosen (business) (1930–2025), chief executive officer of SEGA
  - David Rosen (entomologist) (1936–1997), Israeli entomologist
  - David Rosen (musicologist) (born 1938), professor of musicology at Cornell University
  - David Rosen (politics), fundraiser for Hillary Clinton in 2000
  - David Rosen (rabbi) (born 1951), former Chief Rabbi of Ireland
  - David M. Rosen, American anthropologist
- Donn Eric Rosen, (1929–1986) American ichthyologist
- Eliyahu Chaim Rosen (1899–1984), Polish-born rabbi in Ukraine
- Eric Rosen (disambiguation), several people, including:
  - Eric S. Rosen (born 1953), Kansas Supreme Court Justice
  - Eric Rosen (playwright) (born 1970), American theater director and playwright
  - Eric Rosen (chess player) (born 1993), American chess player and streamer
- Eunice Rosen (1930–2019), American bridge player
- Frank Rosen (1918–1998), South African artist
- Fred Rosen (disambiguation), several people, including:
  - Fred Rosen (author) (1953–2020), true crime author and former columnist for The New York Times
  - Fred Rosen (businessman), former CEO of Ticketmaster, co-founder of the Bel Air Homeowners Alliance
  - Fred Rosen (physician) (1930–2005), American medical researcher
- Freda Rosen (1945–2007), American playwright, director, political activist, social therapist and mentor
- Friedrich Rosen (1856–1935), German Orientalist, diplomat and politician
- Gerald Ellis Rosen (born 1951), American judge
- Gerald Harris Rosen (born 1933), American theoretical physicist
- Goody Rosen (1912–1994), Canadian All Star major league baseball player
- Gustaf-Fredrik von Rosen (1895–1956), Swedish officer and murderer
- Harold Rosen (electrical engineer) (1926–2017), American electrical engineer
- Harris Rosen (1939–2024), American hotelier and philanthropist
- Harry Rosen (1931–2023), Canadian businessman
- Harvey Rosen (1949–2022), Canadian mayor
- Herb Rosen, founder of Skippers Seafood & Chowder House
- Hilary Rosen (born 1958), former chief executive of the RIAA

=== J–Z ===
- Jack Rosen (born 1949), chairman of the American Jewish Congress
- Jacky Rosen (born 1957), American politician
- James Rosen (disambiguation), several people, including:
  - James Rosen (jurist) (1909–1972), United States federal judge
  - James Rosen (journalist) (born 1968), American journalist
- Jay Rosen (born 1956), American journalism professor
- Jay Rosen (drummer) (born 1961), American musician
- Jeffrey Rosen (disambiguation), several people
- Jelka Rosen (1868–1935), Serbian painter
- Jeremy Rosen (born 1942), British-born Orthodox rabbi
- John Rosen, Canadian criminal defence lawyer
- Joseph Rosen (1858–1936), rabbi, the Rogatchover Gaon
- Joseph A. Rosen (1877–1949), American agronomist
- Josh Rosen (born 1997), American football player
- Kelly Rosen (born 1995), Estonian footballer
- Larry Rosen (executive) (born 1956), Canadian retail chief executive officer
- Lawrence Rosen (anthropologist) (born 1941), American anthropologist
- Lawrence Rosen (attorney), American attorney and computer specialist
- Leo Rosen (1916–1991), American cryptoanalyst
- Leonard M. Rosen (1930–2014), American attorney
- Louis Rosen (1918–2009), nuclear physicist
- Marion Rosen (1914-2012), German-American physiotherapist
- Mel Rosen (1928–2018), American track coach
- Martin Rosen (director) (born 1936), British film director
- Michael Rosen (born 1946), English poet, broadcaster and educationalist
- Michel de Rosen (born 1951), U.S. businessman
- Milton Rosen (1915–2014), Engineer and project manager in the US space program
- Moishe Rosen (1932–2010), founder of Jews for Jesus
- Moses Rosen (1912–1994), Chief Rabbi of Romania
- Nancy Rosen, U.S. sculptor
- Nathan Rosen (1909–1995), Israeli physicist
- Nir Rosen (born 1977), American journalist and chronicler of the Iraq War
- Paul Rosen (born 1960), Canadian sledge hockey goalie and motivational speaker
- Phil Rosen (1888–1951), American film director and cinematographer
- Pinchas Rosen (1887–1978), Israeli founder, statesman and lawyer
- Rachel Rosen (born 1983), American physicist
- Rich Rosen (born 1956), software developer
- Robert Rosen (disambiguation), several people, including:
  - Robert Rosen (photographer), Australian photographer
  - Robert Rosen (theoretical biologist) (1934–1998), American theoretical biologist
  - Robert Rosen (writer) (born 1952), American writer
- Roman Rosen (1849–1921), Russian diplomat
- Sam Rosen (comics) (1922–1992), comic book author
- Sam Rosen (sportscaster) (born 1948), U.S. sportscaster
- Selina Rosen (born 1960), U.S. science fiction publisher, editor, and author
- Shabtai Rosenne (1917–2010), UK-born Israeli professor and diplomat
- Shlomo Rosen (1905–1985), Israeli politician and minister
- Sherwin Rosen (1938–2001), American labor economist
- Shlomo Sorin Rosen (born 1978), Prime Rabbi of Romania
- Stan Rosen (1906–1984), American NFL football player
- Stanley Rosen (1929–2014), American philosopher
- Stephen Rosen (disambiguation) or Steven Rosen, several people
- William Rosen (1928–2019), American bridge player
- Zack Rosen (born 1989), All-American basketball player at University of Pennsylvania; plays for Maccabi Ashdod in Israel

== Fictional characters ==
- Dr. Arnold Rosen, a cardiologist on Mad Men, who lives one floor below the Drapers
- Sylvia Rosen, Arnold Rosen's wife on Mad Men
- David Rosen, the Attorney General of the United States on Scandal

== See also ==
- Roesen, a surname
- Rosén, a surname
- Rosen College of Hospitality Management (College of the University of Central Florida), academic college
- John and Zeta Rosen Way, Edmonton, Canada
- Rozov, a surname
