= David Rosen =

David Rosen may refer to:

- David Rosen (businessman) (1930–2025), CEO of SEGA
- David Rosen (entomologist) (1936–1997), Israeli entomologist
- David Rosen (musicologist) (born 1938), professor of musicology at Cornell University
- David Rosen (politics), fundraiser for Hillary Clinton in 2000
- David Rosen (rabbi) (born 1951), former Chief Rabbi of Ireland
- David Rosen (literary scholar), American literary scholar
- David M. Rosen, American anthropologist
- David Rosen (artist) (1959–2014), South African artist and fashion designer
- David H. Rosen (1945–2024), American psychiatrist, Jungian analyst and author
- David Rosen, CEO and lead programmer at Wolfire Games
- David Rosen (Scandal), a fictional character in the TV series
