= Frederick Rose =

Frederick or Fred Rose may refer to:

- Frederick Rose (surgeon) (died 1873), British naval surgeon awarded the American Congressional Gold Medal
- Frederick Campbell Rose (1865–1946), Scottish irrigation engineer working in India
- Frederick George Rose (1915–1991), communist activist, public servant and anthropologist
- Fred Rose (songwriter) (1897–1954), songwriter and publisher of country music
- Fred Rose (politician) (1907–1983), Polish-born communist politician and trade union organiser in Canada
- Fred Rose (footballer) (1919–1988), Australian rules footballer
- Frederick J Rose (1831–1920), Headmaster-Superintendent of Victorian School for Deaf Children
- Frederick P. Rose (1923–1999), American real estate developer and philanthropist
- Fred La Rose (c. 1870–1940), also known as Fred Rose, blacksmith from Quebec who discovered silver in 1903

== See also ==
- Fred Rosen (disambiguation)
