= Stephen Rosen =

Stephen Rosen or Steven Rosen may refer to:

- Stephen Peter Rosen, professor of national security and military affairs at Harvard University
- Steven M. Rosen (born 1942), Canadian psychologist and philosopher
- Steve J. Rosen (1942-2024), lobbyist and policy director of American Israel Public Affairs Committee
- Steven J. Rosen (born 1955), American author, also known as Satyaraja Dasa
- Steven A. Rosen (born 1954), archaeologist
- Steven T. Rosen, American oncologist
