= Rosenov =

Rosenov (Bulgarian Росенов, feminine Rosenova) is a Bulgarian surname, and a variation of Rosen. Notable people with the surname include:

- Petko Rosenov Hristov (born 1999), Bulgarian footballer
- Radoslav Rosenov (born 2003 or 2004), Bulgarian boxer
