= Fred Rosen =

Fred Rosen may refer to:

- Fred Rosen (physician) (1930–2005), paediatrician and immunologist at Harvard Medical School
- Fred Rosen (author), (1953-2020) true crime author and former columnist for The New York Times
- Fred Rosen (businessman), former CEO of Ticketmaster, co-founder of the Bel Air Homeowners Alliance

== See also ==
- Fred Rose (disambiguation)
