= In the Hearts of Green Birds =

In the Hearts of Green Birds: The Martyrs of Bosnia, a book by various anonymous authors about the war in Bosnia and Herzegovina, is a foundational text in Islamist literature and exists in numerous languages and recensions. It focuses on the deaths of foreign Muslims who had gone to Bosnia to serve as fighters, or mujahadin and describes their deaths as that of martyrs (in Arabic, shuhadaa, plural for shahid). The book is available on many Internet sites and is especially popular in audio format, which was the original form before it appeared as a printed text. Audio versions include anaasheed (plural for nasheed), Islamic-oriented songs that were recorded by shuhadaa before their deaths. (Devji: 87, 110)

The title refers to the common belief that the souls of martyrs are carried in the hearts of green birds. This idea has also been an inspiration for a book of a similar name but very different subject matter, In the Belly of the Green Bird, which is an account of the fall of Saddam Hussein and the US military operations in Iraq (Xenakis). Nir Rosen is the author of this latter book.

The book is also said to have lured British shoe-bomber, Saajid Badat, into travelling to Afghanistan to join al-Qaeda in 2001.
