= Mary Hockaday (physicist) =

American physicist

- Born: Mary Yvonne Pottenger Hockaday; 1957 (age 68–69)
- Education: University of Hawaiʻi at Mānoa; New Mexico State University
- Scientific career
- Workplaces: Los Alamos National Laboratory
- Thesis: An experimental measurement of metal multilayer X-ray reflectivity degradation due to intense X-ray flux (1987)
- Website: www.tms.org/meetings/2016/diversity2016/bio_Hockaday.aspx

Mary Yvonne Pottenger Hockaday (born 1957) is an American physicist who works at the Los Alamos National Laboratory. She was elected a Fellow of the American Association for the Advancement of Science in 2014 and the American Physical Society in 2022.

== Early life and education ==
Hockaday was an undergraduate student in physics at the University of Hawaiʻi at Mānoa. She moved to New Mexico State University for her doctoral research, where she studied the degradation of X-Ray reflectivity from metals due to an intense X-Ray flux.

== Research and career ==
In 1986, Hockaday joined Los Alamos National Laboratory. She was appointed a staff member in the Fast Transient Plasma group and developed X-ray diagnostics for the Nevada Test Site. As nuclear testing slowed down, she switched her focus to high-powered lasers. She was one of the first researchers to deploy proton radiography to image the inside of a nuclear explosion, which she achieved using the Los Alamos Neutron Science Center (LANSCE). Hockaday was involved with the development of the Dual-Axis Radiographic Hydrotest Facility (DAHRT).

Hockaday was a long-standing member of the Weapons Physics Directorate. She was responsible for developing the inertial confinement fusion campaign. In 2013, Hockaday was named associate director of the Los Alamos National Laboratory. She was responsible for MaRIE (Making, Measuring, and Modeling Extremes), a facility that worked to create a free electron laser.

In 2018, Hockaday was made lead of the Nuclear Engineering and Nonproliferation Division. She develops nuclear safeguards and instrumentation to monitor nuclear materials.

== Awards and honors ==
- 2014 Elected Fellow of the American Association for the Advancement of Science
- 2014 New Mexico State University Distinguished Alumni Award
- 2022 Elected Fellow of the American Physical Society
