= Leon Shklar =

American computer scientist

Leon Shklar had been a part time lecturer in the computer science department at Rutgers University, where he taught a senior level course in advanced web application development. He is also the co-author (with Rich Rosen) of the popular textbook Web Application Architecture: Principles, Protocols, and Practices. He was formerly Head of Technology at Thomson Reuters Media. Prior to that he was the director of software development at Dow Jones.

Shklar was one of the people at Bell Communications Research responsible for InfoHarness, one of the earliest (1995) metadata-driven web application systems. He also led the team that developed Metaphoria, one of the first commercially available Java-based server-side web frameworks. Shklar has served on the Advisory Committee of the World Wide Web Consortium (W3C) and was actively involved in the development of the RDF standard.

== Publications ==
- Shklar, Leon; Rosen, Richard (2003). Web Application Architecture: Principles, Protocols and Practices. Wiley. ISBN 0-471-48656-6.
- Kashyap, Vipul; Shklar, Leon, eds. (2002). Real World Semantic Web Applications - Frontiers in Artificial Intelligence and Applications. Ios Press. ISBN 1-58603-306-9.
