= Eric Rosen =

Eric Rosen may refer to:

- Erik Rosén (1883–1967), Swedish film actor
- Eric S. Rosen (born 1953), American judge
- Eric Rosen (playwright) (born 1970), American theater director and playwright
- Eric Rosen (chess player) (born 1993), American chess player and streamer
