= Paul DeBach =

American entomologist

Paul Hevener DeBach (December 28, 1914 – February 15, 1992) was an American entomologist who was a specialist on biological control. He wrote the influential book Biological Control by Natural Enemies first published in 1974 which went through several editions and helped in the development of the field of biological control.

DeBach was born in Miles City, Montana but grew up in Southern California after his parents moved there. He went to Fairfax High School in Hollywood and then went to University of California, Los Angeles. After majoring in entomology he received a BA in 1938. He continued studies at Riverside in the Citrus Experiment Station under Harry Scott Smith and received a Ph.D. in 1940 on biological control. He joined the US Public Health Service in 1942 as an entomologist in the malaria control effort and later joined the US Department of Agriculture working on the control of the white fringed beetle. He returned to the Citrus Experiment Station at Riverside after World War II and worked there until retirement in 1983.

DeBach was among the first entomologists to begin formal courses in biological control and wrote the first major textbook that defined the field, Biological Control by Natural Enemies (1974), a second edition of which was written along with David Rosen. He attempted to provide theoretical bases for the evaluation and choice of biological control agents. He was involved in measures to control the wooly whitefly in southern California in the 1970s using parasitic wasps. Similar work was carried out for the control. In the course of his use of parasitic wasps, he also worked on the taxonomy of the genus Aphytis. DeBach introduced the "Check method" which compares the effect of biological control agents against insecticide-based control and examined ecological issues involved in the establishment of biological control agents. DeBach edited a major work on the Biological Control of Insect Pests and Weeds (1964) and was involved in numerous international collaborations involved in pest management.
