= In the Belly of the Green Bird =

2006 book by Nir Rosen

- Author: Nir Rosen
- Publisher: Free Press
- Publication date: 2006
- Pages: 264 pp
- ISBN: 978-0-7432-7703-7
- OCLC: 63390863

In the Belly of the Green Bird is a 2006 book by Nir Rosen which describes the events in Iraq after the U.S. invasion of Iraq and the fall of Saddam Hussein.

The book builds on nearly three years spent in Iraq observing ordinary life and talking with a wide range of people involved in and affected by the violence. Rosen's thesis is that Iraq is now in a state of civil war and that the U.S. can do little to stop the increasing violence. Rosen was able to take advantage of his fluent Arabic to mix unobtrusively with Iraqis and to dispense with translators in his interviews.

The book should not be confused with In the Hearts of Green Birds, an Islamist text about the war in Bosnia. Both books take their titles from the common belief that the souls of martyrs live in Paradise in the hearts of green birds.
