= Rosen Method Bodywork =

Alternative medicine and bodywork method

Rosen Method Bodywork (or Rosen Method) is a type of complementary and alternative medicine. This bodywork, described as 'psychosomatic', claims to help integrate one's bodily and emotional/mental experience. In the tradition of sensory awareness methods, Rosen Method Bodywork focuses clients' attention onto internal sensations and emotions that arise as areas for the body are gently contacted with a 'listening' touch. This means that the practitioner's goal is not to manipulate or fix clients but rather to notice areas of tension and stillness. The practitioner uses words to help clients become aware of these held places in the body and encourages clients to describe what they are feeling.

Clients felt experiences can arise directly from the held places or from life events, both present and past. This nonjudgmental noticing and listening by the practitioner helps clients to identify unconscious patterns of muscular holdings, feelings, and learned behavioral responses. Rosen Method Bodywork, therefore, is presumed to help clients have greater access to their interoception, their ability to feel the inner condition of the body. Research studies show that higher levels of interception are connected to greater resilience, improved immune function, and the reduction of stress, anxiety, and depression.

The main theory underpinning this method is that a person protects themselves from past painful experiences through tightening muscles in the body that are involved in emotional expression and suppression, especially in the diaphragm, the prime muscle of breathing. Chronic, unconscious muscular tightening suppresses interoception and therefore separates one from one's true self, since many interoceptive sensations, feelings and emotional responses have not been able to be felt in the body, and thus cannot be known, acted upon or modulated in the present. This alleged protection against feeling and knowing how past difficult experiences are underlying one's perceptions, beliefs and experience of living is said to be experienced most frequently as chronic musculoskeletal pain and tension.

This tension and resulting pain can purportedly be observed by the bodywork practitioners as restricted patterns of movement and posture, muscular tension, or shortness of breath. Rosen Method Bodywork practitioners address these patterns by using words to build client awareness while clients lie comfortably on a massage table. In this state of possible relaxation, many muscles do not fully relax, including the diaphragm. Rosen Method Bodywork practitioners contact this tension with a non-intrusive, listening and responsive touch along with words that reflect shifts in the body's muscles and breath. As muscles relax and breathing deepens, feelings and memories of what has been held out of conscious awareness by chronic tension becomes conscious. The diaphragm muscle is exquisitely sensitive to the part of the nervous system that regulates a person's internal assessment of threat or safety, so a sense of safety, both in the relationship with the practitioner and within the self, is what allows the diaphragm to release fully.

Through the relaxation which "unlocks" these unconscious patterns, Rosen Method Bodywork purports to integrate the body, mind, emotions and spirit. As in many other spiritual methods which seek to free the breath, the breath is viewed as a "gateway to awareness". The diapragm muscle relaxes and the breath is less constrained when one feels safe, or solves a problem, or has a true insight that brings more understanding of the self and the world. The naturally full breath of a released diaphragm is one of the elements of spiritual or transcendent experience, in which one's personal boundaries become more expansive and permeable, and one feels connected to something greater than oneself, connected to all that there is in the universe.

Quackwatch categorized Rosen Method Bodywork as an "unnaturalistic method."

Rosen Method bodywork has developed through its founder Marion Rosen's physical therapy practice and work with Lucy Heyer, a student of Elsa Gindler. Under Rosen's guidance in 1980, the Rosen Institute (RI) was formed as the governing international organization that protects and sustains the quality and standards of Rosen Method. The Rosen Institute has affiliate training centers in 16 countries and has certified 1150 bodywork practitioners and 150 movement teachers.
