= James Rosen =

James Rosen may refer to:

- James Rosen (jurist) (1909–1972), U.S. federal judge
- James Rosen (journalist) (born 1968), American journalist
- James Rosen (author), American journalist
