= Jeffrey Rosen =

Jeffrey Rosen may refer to:

- Jeffrey Rosen (legal academic) (born 1964), U.S. academic and commentator on legal affairs
- Jeffrey Rosen (businessman), American billionaire businessman
- Jeffrey A. Rosen (born 1958), U.S. lawyer who served as Deputy Attorney General, acting Attorney General, and Deputy Secretary of Transportation
- Jeffrey M. Rosen, American cancer researcher
- Jeff Rosen (prosecutor), Santa Clara County District Attorney in the 2015 criminal case People v. Turner
