= Rozov =

Rozov (Russian: Розов) is a Russian masculine surname, its feminine counterpart is Rozova. It may refer to

- Irina Rozova
- Joram Rozov (born 1938), Israeli artist
- Valery Rozov (1964–2017), Russian skydiver
- Viktor Rozov

== See also ==
- Rosen
