= Rosén =

Rosén is a Swedish surname.

== Geographical distribution ==
As of 2014, 96.9% of all known bearers of the surname Rosén were residents of Sweden (frequency 1:1,475) and 1.5% of Norway (1:50,415).

In Sweden, the frequency of the surname was higher than national average (1:1,475) in the following counties:

1. Gävleborg County (1:784)
2. Kalmar County (1:824)
3. Östergötland County (1:826)
4. Kronoberg County (1:957)
5. Dalarna County (1:1,007)
6. Jönköping County (1:1,039)
7. Södermanland County (1:1,193)
8. Uppsala County (1:1,245)
9. Örebro County (1:1,333)
10. Halland County (1:1,470)

In the United States the surname is recorded as Rosen despite efforts by families and people with the surname to have it corrected. Populations with the name are known to live in Minnesota, Colorado, Washington, and New Jersey.

== People ==
- Anton Rosén (Born 1991), Swedish motorcycle speedway rider
- Bengt Rosén (1936–2017), Swedish politician
- Calle Rosén (born 1994), Swedish professional ice hockey defenceman
- Conny Rosén (born 1971), Swedish footballer
- Erik Rosén (1883–1967), Swedish film actor
- Göta Rosén (1904–2006), Swedish politician and social worker
- Gunhild Rosén (1855–1928), Swedish ballerina, choreographer and ballet master
- Gustav Rosén (1876–1942), Swedish newspaper owner, journalist and politician
- Isak Rosén (born 2003), Swedish ice hockey player
- Jonas Rosén (born 1958), Swedish fencer
- Kjell Rosén (1921–1999), Swedish footballer
- Magnus Rosén (born 1963), Swedish musician
- Nils Rosén (1902–1951), Swedish footballer
- Robert Rosén (born 1987), Swedish professional ice hockey centre
- Sven Rosén (1887–1963), Swedish gymnast
- Sven Rosén (1708–1750), Swedish Radical-Pietistic writer and leader

== See also ==
- Rosen
