= Los Alamos Neutron Science Center =

One of the world's most powerful linear accelerators

Coordinates: 35.869055°N 106.261943°W

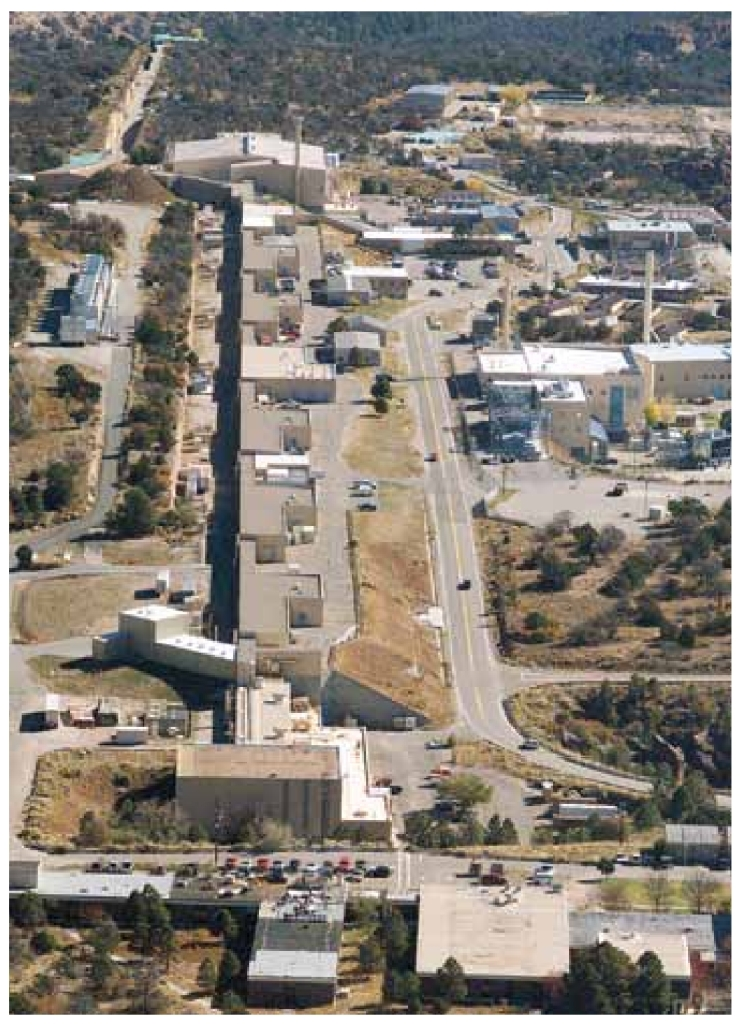
- Field of research: Material science, Nuclear physics, and Particle physics
- Location: New Mexico
- Affiliations: Los Alamos National Laboratory
- Website: lansce.lanl.gov

The Los Alamos Neutron Science Center (LANSCE), formerly known as the Los Alamos Meson Physics Facility (LAMPF), is one of the world's most powerful linear accelerators. It is located in Los Alamos National Laboratory in New Mexico in Technical Area 53. It was the most powerful linear accelerator in the world when it was opened in June 1972. The technology used in the accelerator was developed under the direction of nuclear physicist Louis Rosen. The facility is capable of accelerating protons up to 800 MeV. Multiple beamlines allow for a variety of experiments to be run at once, and the facility is used for many types of research in materials testing and neutron science. It is also used for medical radioisotope production.

LANSCE provides the scientific community with intense sources of neutrons with the capability of performing experiments supporting civilian and national security research. Agencies and programs of the Department of Energy – the National Nuclear Security Administration, the Office of Science, the Office of Nuclear Energy, and the Office of Science and Technology – have been the principal sponsors of LANSCE. LANSCE serves an international user community conducting diverse forefront basic and applied research.

== History ==
Since 1972, the 800-million-electronvolt (MeV) accelerator and its attendant facilities at Technical Area 53 of the Los Alamos National Laboratory have been a resource to a broad international community of scientific researchers. The Los Alamos Meson Physics Facility (LAMPF), as it was originally called, hosted about 1000 users per year to perform medium energy physics experiments.

In 1977, a pulsed spallation neutron source was commissioned to supply moderated (faster neutrons slowed down by passing through various materials) and unmoderated neutrons to time-of-flight experiments in the facility called the Weapons Neutron Research (WNR) Center. Neutron scattering experiments were started immediately and by 1983 the Department of Energy's Office of Basic Energy Sciences (BES) was funding a formal user program. Beginning in 1985, with the completion of the Proton Storage Ring that compresses proton pulses from 750 microseconds to a quarter of a microsecond, the Los Alamos Neutron Scattering Center, now known as the Lujan Center, was established while WNR was expanded to other spallation sources in the accelerator beam.

In 1995 LAMPF was renamed the Los Alamos Neutron Science Center (LANSCE) to reflect the broad base of neutron research being conducted on behalf of the weapons program and basic research; the name of the BES neutron scattering facility was simultaneously changed from LANSCE to the Manuel Lujan Jr. Neutron Scattering Center. In 1996, a Memorandum of Understanding (MOU) was established between the Department of Energy's Offices of Energy Research and Defense Programs to define the stewardship of the facility and its experimental areas in the context of the new Science Based Stockpile Stewardship program. In 2001, the MOU was rewritten to include three branches of the Department of Energy (DOE)—the National Nuclear Security Administration Defense Program, the Office of Science, and the Office of Nuclear Energy—and the Laboratory officially designated LANSCE as a user facility.

Several key events have occurred that fostered the growth of the user programs at LANSCE. In 1968 through 1995, the DOE Office of Energy Research funded LAMPF as a user facility for medium energy physics and a user group was incorporated in 1972. Beginning approximately in 1977, Office of Basic Energy Sciences has provided funding of a new experimental area completed in 1990, including office space, the Los Alamos Neutron Scattering Center (later the Los Alamos Neutron Science Center) became a Designated National User Facility. In 2011, this status was extended to WNR and to the proton radiography facility.

== Facilities ==
Users conduct research at five facilities provided by LANSCE:

=== Isotope Production Facility ===
The Isotope Production Facility (IPF) produces a wide range of radioactive isotopes for medical, environmental, industrial and research applications using the 100-MeV proton beam available from the first part of the accelerator.

=== Lujan Neutron Scattering Center ===
The Lujan Neutron Scattering Center (Lujan Center) employs a pulsed spallation neutron source equipped with time-of-flight spectrometers for neutron scattering studies. Neutron scattering is a powerful technique for probing the microscopic structure and dynamics and is used in materials science, engineering, condensed matter physics, chemistry, biology, and geology.

=== Proton Radiography Facility ===
The Proton Radiography Facility (pRad) uses 800-MeV protons provided by the LANSCE accelerator facility, to investigate dynamic experiments in support of national and international weapons science and stockpile stewardship programs.

=== Ultracold neutrons ===
Researchers working at LANSCE and eight other member institutions of an international collaboration have constructed the most intense source of ultra-cold (that is, very slow) neutrons in the world. The associated experiments may answer questions about the fundamental constants of nature and aid in the quest for new particles.

=== Weapons Neutron Research Facility ===
The Weapons Neutron Research Facility (WNR) provides neutron and proton beams for basic, applied, and defense-related research. Neutron beams with energies ranging from about 0.1 MeV to more than 600 MeV are produced in Target 4 (an unmoderated tungsten spallation source) using the 800-MeV proton beam from the LANSCE linac. In the Target-2 area, samples can be exposed to the direct 800-MeV proton beam.

== User Program ==
A significant number of students and postdoctoral researchers who become familiar with the Laboratory through their experiences at LANSCE become part of the permanent workforce, joining many different technical organizations.

=== User Demographics ===
The User Program's demographics count user visits and unique-users. User visits are the total number of visits by all users. A unique-user is defined as counting a user only once— the first time they come to LANSCE during a calendar year. The largest segment of unique-users at the Lujan Center came from the academic community; at WNR users come from academic, industrial, and national laboratories. A majority of the WNR industry users are from firms that produce or use semiconductor devices. The semiconductor industry relies on WNR's unique capabilities to test their latest generation of chips for resistance to neutron-induced upsets. Neutron-induced upsets produced by energetic neutrons are important due to the natural production of high-energy neutrons by cosmic rays.
