= David H. Rosen =

American psychiatrist (1945–2024)

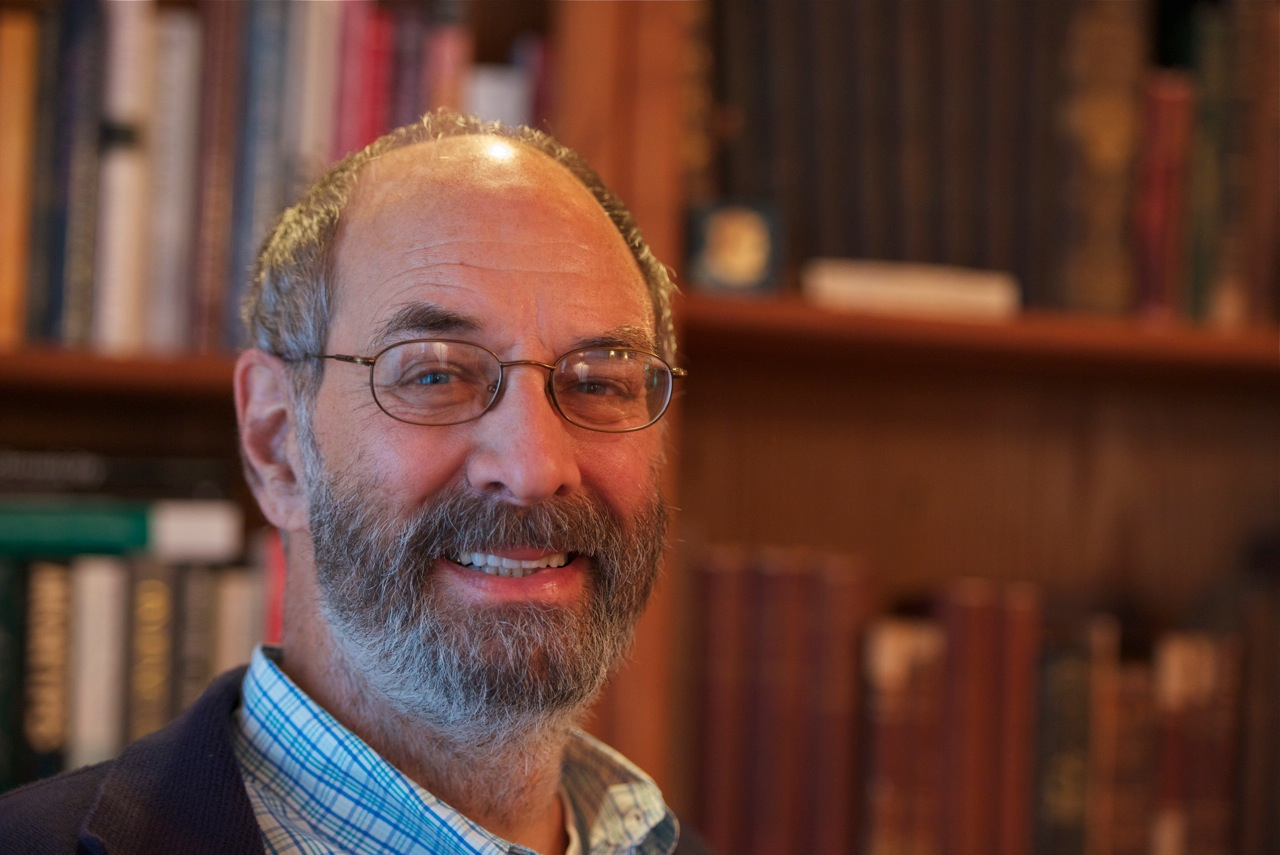
- Born: February 25, 1945; Port Chester, New York, U.S.
- Died: May 7, 2024 (aged 79); Eugene, Oregon, U.S.
- Education: University of California, Berkeley; University of Missouri School of Medicine
- Known for: Patient-Centered Medicine: A Human Experience, Transforming Depression: Healing the Soul through Creativity, The Tao of Jung, The Healing Spirit of Haiku, The Tao of Elvis, Clouds and More Clouds, Torii Haiku: Profane to Sacred Life
- Scientific career
- Fields: Psychiatry, Analytical Psychology, Haiku, Medical Humanities, Elvis Scholarship, Children's Literature
- Workplaces: UCSF Medical Center; University of Rochester Medical Center; Texas A&M University

David H. Rosen (February 25, 1945 – May 7, 2024) was an American psychiatrist, Jungian analyst and author, who was the first holder of the McMillan Professorship in Analytical Psychology, Professor of Psychiatry & Behavioral Science, and Professor of Humanities in Medicine at Texas A&M University.

At the time of his death, he lived in Eugene, Oregon, and was a member of the Pacific Northwest Society of Jungian Analysts and an Affiliate Professor of Psychiatry at Oregon Health & Science University. His research interests include analytical psychology, psychology of religion, psychology of humor, positive psychology, depression, suicidology, children's literature, social medicine and psychiatry; epidemiology, healing, ethics, peace, creativity, and the psychosocial, psychiatric, and human aspects of medicine.

== Background ==
Rosen graduated from the University of California, Berkeley with an individual major in Psychological-Biological Sciences, and then went to University of Missouri School of Medicine. He did his internship at the University of California Service at San Francisco General Hospital. and his psychiatric residency at the Langley Porter Institute at the University of California Medical Center.

He was appointed first lecturer and then assistant professor of psychiatry at the UCSF Medical Center. He then moved at the request of Dr. George Engel to the University of Rochester Medical Center as associate professor of Psychiatry and Medicine. Following that, he spent 25 years as the McMillan Professor of Analytical Psychology, Professor of Psychiatry, and Professor of Humanities in Medicine at Texas A&M University.

Rosen did post-graduate training in Analytical Psychology at the C.G. Jung Institute of San Francisco, California and became certified as a member of the Inter-Regional Society of Jungian Analysts and the International Association for Analytical Psychology. He was later a member of the Pacific Northwest Society of Jungian Analysts.

Rosen died in Eugene, Oregon on May 7, 2024, at the age of 79.

== Professional work ==
Rosen is best known for his research involving interviews of survivors of jumps off the Golden Gate Bridge and the therapeutic approach of egocide & transformation in treating suicidally depressed individuals (see "Transforming Depression: Healing the Soul through Creativity").

He edited a book, Less is More: A Collection of Ten-Minute Plays, which contains two plays of his own: "Leap for Life" and "Thanatos Calling." The first concerns survivors of jumps off the Golden Gate Bridge, and the other is about an elderly suicidal woman.

While at UCSF, Rosen received the Henry F. Albronda Memorial Award, the Academic Senate's Award for Distinction in Teaching, the Kaiser Award for Excellence in Teaching, and was selected to attend the National Endowment for the Humanities summer seminar for health professionals. He was also awarded the Outstanding Young Physician Award by the Medical Alumni Organization (University of Missouri), and was elected to Fellowship in the American Psychiatric Association. In 2003, he was designated Distinguished Fellow in the American Psychiatric Association and was elected to Fellowship in the American Academy of Psychoanalysis. He was the recipient of the Psychiatric Excellence Award by the Texas Society of Psychiatric Physicians in 2004. Rosen was named the Distinguished Life Fellow by the American Psychiatric Association in 2006. He and his co-authors received the Article-of-the-Year Award by AcademyHealth for their paper “Two-minute mental health care for elderly patients: Inside primary care visits." Rosen was the recipient of a Glasscock Center for Humanities Research Stipendiary Fellowship at Texas A&M for 2009–2010. He retired from Texas A&M in 2011 and was later affiliated with Oregon Health & Science University.

== Publications ==
Rosen published over 100 peer-reviewed articles and chapters and authored and edited over 20 books. Additionally, he was the editor for 20 volumes of the Fay Book Series in Analytical Psychology (Texas A&M University Press) from 1991 to 2017. He also wrote the forewords for these volumes:

- "Joy, Inspiration, and Hope" by Verena Kast
- "Integrity in Depth" by John Beebe
- "The Two Million-Year-Old Self" by Anthony Stevens
- "The Stillness Shall be the Dancing: Feminine and Masculine in Emerging Balance" by Marion Woodman
- "Buddhism and the Art of Psychotherapy" by Hayao Kawai
- "Gender and Desire: Uncursing Pandora" by Polly Young-Eisendrath
- "Transformation: Emergence of the Self" by Murray Stein
- "The Archetypal Imagination" by James Hollis
- "Soul and Culture" by Roberto Gambini
- "The Black Sun: The Alchemy and Art of Darkness" by Stanton Marlan
- "The Old Woman's Daughter: Transformative Wisdom for Men and Women" by Claire Douglas
- "Memories of our Lost Hands: Searching for Feminine Spirituality and Creativity" by Sonoko Toyoda
- "Ethics and Analysis: Philosophical Perspectives and their Application in Therapy" by Luigi Zoja
- "The Therapeutic Relationship: Transference, Countertransference, and the Making of Meaning" by Jan Wiener
- "Synchronicity: Nature and Psyche in an Interconnected Universe" by Joseph Cambray
- "Connecting with South Africa: Cultural Communication and Understanding" by Astrid Berg
- "Finding Jung: Frank N. McMillan Jr., A Life in Quest of the Lion" by Frank N. McMillan III
- "Madness and Creativity" by Ann Belford Ulanov
- "Brothers and Sisters: Myth and Reality" by Henry Abramovitch
- "The Soul of Art: Analysis and Creation" by Christian Gaillard

He was the author of over a hundred Haiku including the books "Clouds and More Clouds," published by Lily Pool Press (2013), "Spelunking Through Life" (2016), "Living with Evergreens" (2017), and "White Rose, Red Rose" (2017) with Johnny Baranski. He also co-authored "Patient-Centered Medicine: A Human Experience" with Uyen Hoang, published by Oxford University Press (2017). See bibliography for complete list of publications.

== Artwork ==
Rosen was a painter using watercolor and acrylic.

== Bibliography ==
- Rosen, D.H. (1974). Lesbianism: A Study of Female Homosexuality. Springfield, IL: Charles C. Thomas.
- Rosen, D.H. (1984). Henry's Tower, Pittsford, NY: Platypus Books. (Children's Book)
- Reiser, D.E. & Rosen, D.H. (1985). Medicine as a Human Experience. Gaithersburg, MD: Aspen Publishers, Inc.
- Rosen, D.H. (1993). Transforming Depression: Healing the Soul through Creativity. 3rd Ed. New York: Putnam & Sons. (1993) Penquin (1996) York Beach, ME: Nicolas-Hays (2002)
- Rosen, D.H. (1996). The Tao of Jung: The Way of Integrity, New York: Viking. (1996) Penquin (1997)
- Rosen, D.H. & M.C. Luebbert, (Eds.) (1999). Evolution of the Psyche. Westport, CT: Praeger.
- Rosen, D.H. (2002). The Tao of Elvis. San Diego: Harcourt. (2012) Pittsboro, NC: Rosenberry Books (2012) Eugene, OR: Wipf and Stock Publishers (2013)
- Rosen, D.H. & Weishaus J. (2004). The Healing Spirit of Haiku. Berkeley, CA: North Atlantic Books. Reissued by Resource Publications (2014)
- Rosen, D.H. (2013). "Clouds and More Clouds". Northfield, MA: Lily Pool Press.
- Rosen, D.H. (2014). "Lost in the Long White Cloud: Finding My Way Home". Eugene, OR: Wipf and Stock Publishers. (Memoir)
- Rosen, D.H. (2015). "Time, Love and Licorice: A Healing Coloring Storybook". Eugene, OR: Wipf and Stock Publishers.
- Rosen, D.H. and Goodman C., (Eds.) (2016) "Darkness Holding Light: A Collection of Poems". Eugene, OR: Wipf and Stock Publishers.
- Rosen, D.H. (2016). "Spelunking through Life: A Collection of Haiku". Pittsboro, NC: Rosenberry/ Eugene, OR: Wipf and Stock Publishers.
- Rosen, D.H. (2016). "Less is More: A Collection of Ten-Minute Plays". Eugene, OR: Wipf and Stock Publishers.
- Rosen, D.H. (2016). "Living with Evergreens: A Collection of Haiku". Pittsboro, NC: Rosenberry/Eugene, OR: Wipf and Stock Publishers.
- Rosen, D.H. and Hoang U. (2017). "Patient-Centered Medicine: A Human Experience". New York: Oxford UP.
- Rosen, D.H. (2017). "In Search of the Hidden Pond". Eugene, OR: Wipf and Stock Publishers.
- Rosen, D.H. (2017). "The Alchemy of Cooking: Recipes with a Jungian Twist". Eugene, OR: Wipf and Stock Publishers.
- Baranski, J. & Rosen, D.H. (2017). "White Rose, Red Rose: Collection of Haiku". Eugene, OR: Wipf and Stock Publishers.
- Rosen, D.H. (2018). "Samantha the Sleuth and Zack's Hard Lesson" Eugene, OR: Wipf and Stock Publishers. (Children's Book)
- Rosen, D.H. (2018). "Torii Haiku: Profane to a Sacred Life". Eugene, OR: Wipf and Stock Publishers.
- Rosen, D.H. (2018). "Opal Whiteley's Beginning and Hoops and Hoopla". Eugene, OR: Wipf and Stock Publishers. (Children's Book)
- Rosen, D.H. (2019). "Kindergarten Symphony: An ABC Book". Eugene, OR: Wipf and Stock Publishers. (Children's Book)
- Rosen, D.H. (2019). "Look Closely: A Collection of Haiku". Eugene, OR: Wipf and Stock Publishers.
- Rosen, D.H. (2019). "Warming to Gold: A Collection of Haiku". Eugene, OR: Wipf and Stock Publishers.
- Rosen, D.H. and Jensen, J. (2019). "Soul Circles: Mandalas and Meaning". Eugene, OR: Wipf and Stock Publishers.
- Rosen, D.H. and Rosen R. (2019). "Lesbianism: A Study in Female Homosexuality (With a New Father-Daughter Dialogue)". Eugene, OR: Resource Publications (An Imprint of Wipf and Stock Publishers).
- Rosen, D.H. (2021). "Torn Asunder: Putting Back the Pieces". (Memoir) Eugene, OR: Resource Publications.
- Rosen, D.H. (2021). "Soul to Soul: Aphorisms for Life". Eugene, OR: Resource Publications.
