= Frederick Rose (surgeon) =

British naval surgeon

Frederick A. Rose (died July 1873) was a British naval surgeon who was awarded the Congressional Gold Medal in 1858 for aiding American naval personnel aboard the USS Susquehanna who had contracted yellow fever.

When the Susquehanna arrived at Port Royal, Jamaica stricken by an epidemic of yellow fever, the British Royal Navy, under the command of Admiral Sir Houston Stewart placed the naval hospital there at their disposal, and eighty-five of the crew were taken ashore by the boats of the British squadron. Assistant-Surgeon Frederick A. Rose volunteered to join the Susquehanna, at some personal risk to himself (as it was not proved, by Walter Reed, that the virus was transmitted by mosquitoes rather than direct human contact until 1900) and took the care of the sick remaining on board on the voyage from Jamaica to New York City.

It was the first time a Congressional Gold Medal was given to any non-member of the US military.
