= Frederick George Rose =

Frederick George Godfrey Rose
- Born: 1915
- Died: 14 January 1991 (aged 75–76); Berlin, East Germany
- Education: Cambridge University
- Occupations: University Professor, meteorologist
- Notable work: The Wind of Change in Central Australia (1965)
- Political party: Communist Party of Australia

Frederick George Godfrey Rose (1915–1991) was a communist activist, public servant, and anthropologist.

He was the winner of a scholarship to study at Cambridge University. Born in London, he moved to Australia to follow a career as an anthropologist and instead became an assistant Meteorologist. During WWII he became an active member of the Communist Party of Australia, and was put under surveillance by the Australian Security Intelligence Organisation.

In 1954 he appeared twice in a royal commission following accusations that he had been involved in a Soviet spy ring. In 1956 he moved to live in East Germany where he worked for the Humboldt University of Berlin and eventually became a professor. He was also an advocate for the rights of Aboriginal Australians and the author of The Wind of Change in Central Australia (1965). He died on 14 January 1991, in Berlin.

Red Professor, a book about Frederick Rose's life, was shortlisted for the 2016 Prime Minister's History Prize.
