= Nancy Rosen =

American sculptor

Nancy Rosen is an independent curator based in New York City.

In 1980, she founded Nancy Rosen Incorporated, an organization which assists a broad range of government agencies, not-for-profit and academic institutions, corporations, professional firms and individuals to plan, implement and manage fine art collections and public art programs. Her work includes the Art-for-Public-Spaces program for the U.S. Holocaust Memorial Museum in Washington, D.C., and a public art program for Battery Park City, a neighborhood adjacent to the World Trade Center site. She advised the Institute for Advanced Study in Princeton and the Committee for Art in Public Places at Middlebury College.

In 2003, she served on the jury for the World Trade Center Site Memorial Competition.
