= Robert Rosen (photographer) =

Australian photographer

Robert Rosen (born 1953) is an Australian fashion, social and fine art photographer.

== Life and work ==
Born in South Africa, he emigrated with his family to Australia in 1960 and grew up in suburban Melbourne. After high school, he studied photography at the Prahran College of Technology but dropped out after being pressured by a teacher to take a more commercial approach.

He moved to the Sydney suburb of Kings Cross, where he unsuccessfully pursued work as a fashion photographer, before moving to London in 1975. Rosen was active from the 1970s to the 2010s. He retired to live in Bali.

== Collections ==
Rosen's work is held in the Australian National Portrait Gallery and the Museum of Applied Arts and Sciences, Australia; the latter holds an extensive archive of his work.

== Books ==
- Siblings (1999)
- Glitterati: Shooting Fashion, Fame & Fortune (2018)
- Snap!: Twenty Years of Social Photography (2000)
