= Stephen Peter Rosen =

Professor of National Security and Military Affairs

Stephen Peter Rosen is a Harvard College Professor and Beton Michael Kaneb Professor of National Security and Military Affairs in the Government Department in the Faculty of Arts and Sciences at Harvard University and is known as a neoconservative. In addition to his academic work, Rosen was also Master of Harvard College's Winthrop House from 2003 to 2009. He is also Senior Counsellor to the Long Term Strategy Group based in Washington D. C., a defense consulting firm.

== Early life and education ==
Rosen was born in New York City and grew up on Long Island. He received his A.B. (in 1974) and Ph.D. in government from Harvard University. He was influenced by the teaching of Harvey Mansfield as an undergraduate. As a graduate student, Rosen roomed with Bill Kristol and Alan Keyes. His PhD dissertation entitled "Leadership in Foreign Policy" studied the ways in which Alexander Hamilton and Abraham Lincoln tried to moderate American public opinion that could negatively affect American foreign policy. As a postdoctoral fellow at Harvard he worked with Sam Huntington to create the Olin institute for Strategic Studies.

== Career ==
His first book Winning the Next War: Innovation and the Modern Military was published by Cornell University Press in 1991, and received the 1992 Edgar S. Furniss Book Award for outstanding contribution to national security studies from the Ohio State University. The book demonstrates how the dynamics of officer promotion are the key to understanding military innovation in peacetime. Senior officers infrequently change their views, so the key to the military innovation lies in establishing new promotion pathways for younger officers. The book reviews all the major non-nuclear innovation of the 20th century. This book had been cited approximately 1000 times according to Google Scholar, and has been continuously in press since 1991.

His second book Societies and Military power: India and its Armies was published by Cornell University press in 1996 and studied the impact of social structures on military effectiveness. The book explains the strength and weakness of the Indian army during the Mughal, British, and post independent eras. The book shows how military effectiveness on the battlefield could only be achieved at the price of civil-military tensions.

His third book War and Human Nature was published by Princeton University press in 2005. The book connected the literature in biology to the literature in national security, and described the effect of biological mechanisms on stress, status competition, and fear and memory, as they affect national security behavior. The book pays special attention to the factors affecting the behaviors of tyrannies. It did path breaking work showing the connection between biological processes and time horizons. He has published widely in journals including International Security,The Wall Street Journal Foreign Affairs, Journal of Strategic Studies, Joint forces Quarterly, The Washington Quarterly, Foreign Policy, and Diplomatic History. His Op-ed The emperor’s Nuclear Clothes was published in the Wall Street Journal criticizing the nuclear zero movement, arguing that the abolition of nuclear weapons was a utopian pipe dream.

For many years Rosen taught the popular undergraduate course War and Politics, as well as the introductory international relations course International Conflict and Cooperation, and a lecture course on The Ethics of the Conduct of War.

He has been recognized as an outstanding undergraduate teacher and has received all three major awards for excellence in undergraduate teaching from Harvard University: The Harvard College Professorship in 2002, the award from the Alpha and Iota Chapter of Phi Beta Kappa in 2003, and the Levenson Award from the Harvard Undergraduate Council in 2016. In addition, he was co-master of Winthrop House with his wife Mandana Sassanfar in 2003 to 2009, where he was responsible for the well-being of over 350 resident undergraduates. He gave the address at the Harvard ROTC commission ceremony in 2007.

Rosen advised many graduate students, some of whom are now professors at Princeton University, MIT, University of Pennsylvania, Brown University, the University of Wisconsin, Northwestern University, The University of Texas at Austin, and the United States Military Academy.

Parallel to his career in academia, he worked for Herman Kahn at the Hudson Institute (1973 and 1974) and served in the United States government from 1981 to 1990. He worked in the Office of Net Assessment in the Office of the Secretary of Defense 1981-1984 where he was author of the first net assessment of the East Asian military balance. He was the Director of Political-Military Affairs on the staff of the National Security Council 1984-1985 where he was the author of NSDD 166, the strategy document for the American operations in Afghanistan. He taught in the Strategy and Policy Department at the Naval War College from 1986 to 1990. Rosen was associate director of the John M. Olin Institute for Strategic Studies (part of Harvard's Department of Government) from 1990 to 1996, and was Director from 1996 until 2008. Rosen was also a consultant for the President's Commission on Integrated Long-term Strategy.

Shortly after the September 11 attacks, Rosen signed an open letter from the Project for the New American Century to President George W. Bush that advocated war in Afghanistan and "a large increase in defense spending." Rosen also signed the PNAC's Statement of Principles and its controversial 90-page report entitled Rebuilding America's Defenses: Strategies, Forces and Resources for a New Century (2000), advocating the redeployment of U.S. troops in permanent bases in strategic locations throughout the world where they can be ready to act to protect U.S. interests abroad.

In 2007, Rosen was named as a member of foreign policy advisory team of Republican Party presidential candidate Rudy Giuliani.

Rosen holds the view that U.S. military supremacy is not guaranteed into the future, remarking on it that, "we [Americans] have grown up and become accustomed to a world in which we can exercise force majeure and we just can’t do that. And this is not a matter of ideology. This is not a matter of ethics. This is a matter of a change in the character of power and the distribution of power." As of 2015, Rosen did not, however, believe that American power was in decline, telling former roommate Bill Kristol:

We can’t play the same kind of dominant role, but we can and should play a role in creating this new world order in which people in those regions take more responsibility for defending themselves, but where we play a crucial role. And if we don’t do that we are more at risk of losing our republican liberties than if we undertake the tasks that are associated with this more forward posturing.

Rosen currently serves on the advisory board for Washington, DC–based non-profit America Abroad Media.
