= James Rosen (columnist) =

American journalist

- Education: University of California at Berkeley; Columbia University Graduate School of Journalism
- Occupations: Journalist and author
- Notable work: High Hand
- Awards: Society of Professional Journalists award; 2 National Press Club awards; 2 Military Reporters and Editors awards

James Martin Rosen is an American journalist and former Pentagon correspondent for McClatchy. He has covered politics since the 1980s, and has received two National Press Club awards for his reporting in Washington D.C. In 2021 he was honored for general column writing by the Society of Professional Journalists. His articles have been published by the New York Daily News, The News & Observer, the Miami Herald, McClatchy and the Tribune Content Agency. More recently, his columns have run in more than 100 newspapers and news outlets across the country, among them the Guardian, the Boston Globe, Newsday, the Houston Chronicle, and the Detroit Free Press. In 2017 and 2018, he received awards from the Military Reporters and Editors Association for his coverage of the Pentagon.

== Background ==
James Rosen is a native of the Detroit area. He grew up in Oak Park, Michigan. He attended the University of California at Berkeley for his undergraduate degrees in Political Science and Russian Language, and later received his master's degree from the Columbia University Graduate School of Journalism in 1986.

== Positions ==
Rosen served as a Moscow correspondent for UPI, and upon his return to the U.S., he was a reporter for the New York Daily News and an assistant metro editor for the Raleigh News & Observer. Rosen's 1991 front-page New York Daily News article about Donald Trump having stopped a mugging was circulated and commented upon during Donald Trump's 2016 US presidential campaign. Rosen later became a news strategist, a congressional reporter for McClatchy Newspapers and a frequent contributor to Tribune News Service, before becoming a Pentagon correspondent for McClatchy and Washington correspondent for the Miami Herald.

== Reporting ==
During his time as a UPI reporter Rosen covered the collapse of Soviet rule. Later, he began to cover American politics, including the interactions and friction between Senator Jesse Helms and President Bill Clinton. His 1994 article quoting Helms saying Clinton would need a bodyguard if he came to North Carolina prompted congressional hearings and a Secret Service investigation. Rosen's 1996 article about Rep. Fred Heineman claiming he was middle class prompted ridicule in Congress with posters displayed in the House of Representatives. The comment was used in TV political ads against Heineman and were attributed to causing his re-election defeat.

In 1998 Rosen received the Robin Goldstein Award for Washington Regional Reporting from the National Press Club and the National Press Foundation. The award citation described his work during the 1990s as including, "tobacco legislation and … insightful profiles, including a critical view of the plight of black family farmers in North Carolina and a heart-felt tribute column to his own father — all of which showed a keen insight into how Washington-based stories affect the readers back home."

In 2000 he received the McClatchy President's Award for his coverage of the 2000 Presidential recount in Florida. He continued to write stories for McClatchy, often with a focus on a Carolinian perspective. His stories have included coverage of Carolinian politicians like Jim DeMint and Joe Wilson, as well as the Obama administration, the Bush administration, and the Trump administration. In 2012 Rosen received the National Press Club Award for Regional Reporting in Washington D.C. In 2017 Rosen received the James Crawley Award from The Military Reporters and Editors Association for his 2015–16 coverage of the common military target of both the Russian and American militaries (Syria) and the place in history of these parallel efforts. In his military reporting, Rosen has questioned the ability for the US to take care of the veterans of the 21st-century wars in Afghanistan and Iraq. In 2018 Rosen received the Joe Galloway Award from The Military Reporters and Editors Association for his investigative project documenting how elements of the Saudi government evaded responsibility for their role in the Sept. 11, 2001, terror attacks. The project also reported 9/11 families' anger over the U.S. government's role in protecting the Saudis.

== Books ==
In 2016 Rosen co-authored the novel High Hand under the collective pseudonym Curtis J. James, a mash-up of his name and those of the two other authors. The New York Times said the work grasped “the complex craft of espionage” and used it to create "an enthralling work of fiction that is high-voltage from the opening scene." A second edition of the book was published in 2018.
