= Rich Rosen =

Software developer (born 1956)

- Born: May 13, 1956 (age 70)
- Occupation: Software developer

Rich Rosen (born May 13, 1956) is a software developer and an author on the subject of web development, who gained notoriety as an early high-volume contributor to Usenet newsgroups.

== Early life and education ==
Rosen grew up in Forest Hills, Queens, New York. He attended Cornell University and later Queens College, where he received a bachelor's degree in computer science. He later received his master's degree in the same subject from Stevens Institute of Technology in Hoboken, New Jersey, while working at Bell Labs and later at Bellcore.

== 1980s - Bell Labs and Usenet ==
While at Bell Labs and Bellcore (now known as Telcordia Technologies) during the 1980s, Rosen was a lead engineer on the team that beta-tested IBM's then brand-new DB2 relational database management system, which would become one of the first commercially available relational database systems on the market. He also developed one of the earliest online bulletin board systems used to keep telephone operating companies informed about Bell System software standards.

He also acquired a reputation there as a high-volume poster to Usenet newsgroups. The volume of Usenet postings he produced led to rumors that many people were actually using his account, or that he was an AI program produced by Bell Labs to increase the amount of Usenet traffic and thus augment AT&T's long distance telephone revenues. Weekly statistics collected during his heyday often showed that he, by himself, was responsible for more than 2% of the entire volume of Usenet postings. The phrase "We are all Rich Rosen" was coined during this period and persisted as a Usenet catchphrase for a number of years.

Rosen posted in a number of newsgroups on a variety of topics, most particularly music and religion. Among his contributions:

- Rich Rosen's Rules of Netnews Debating, a satirical post intended not so much as a set of guidelines to follow when posting, but rather as a statement (like Godwin's Law) about the irrational and often obnoxious behavior often observed in Usenet discussions (which Rosen himself admittedly engaged in).
- The Book of Ubizmo and the religion of Ubizmatism, a parody of the extremes associated with mainstream organized religions.
- The story of Toejam Jawallaby, a fictitious musician who was the winner of several bogus "greatest guitarist of all time" polls, whose exploits were later expanded upon in the newsgroup rec.music.jazz.
- Several musical compositions that appeared on the first Usenet compilation tape, a little net.music (1985), including A Fair Exchange and Vegetableland (which was ostensibly performed by the aforementioned Toejam Jawallaby).
- Several Usenet April Fool's jokes, including the (now doubly ironic) "Microsoft Windows for the Macintosh" and the "Olfactory Transfer Protocol" (WebOdor).

He was known for participating in (some would say "inciting") numerous flame wars with other Usenet contributors, including the notorious Brahms Gang, a pair of equally loquacious mathematics graduate students from Berkeley (Gene Ward Smith and Matthew P. Wiener) who posted from a server named brahms.berkeley.edu. His verbal battles with the Brahms Gang in particular were sometimes referred to as "The War of the Rosens". He was also known for his variety of frequently-changing .signature files, including:

- Anything's possible, but only a few things actually happen.
- Life is complex. It has real and imaginary parts.
- Look for significance where there's none intended, and you'll surely find it.
- Now I've lost my train of thought, I'll have to catch the bus of thought.
- echo "This is not a pipe." | cat - >/dev/tty

=== Usenet Citations and Acknowledgements ===
The volume and content of Rosen's postings evoked strong reactions in both advocates and detractors. People either praised him for his postings or denounced him as a threat to the future of Usenet.

- His voluminous output and frequently abrasive postings led many to seek his removal from the net. He was never actually banned, censored or otherwise prevented from posting, but his e-mail address was used on the man page for the netnews "expire" command as an example of how this command could be used to delete all postings from a particular user. The use of his address in this manner was viewed by some as an endorsement of censorship and it was eventually removed.
- His notoriety also led Howard Rheingold to use his name in A Slice of Life in My Virtual Community (an article propagated through its inclusion in the Big Dummy's Guide to the Internet) as an example of how people use kill files:
  ... putting the name of a person or topic header in a ``kill file'' (aka ``bozo filter'') means you will never see future contributions from that person or about that topic. You can simply choose to not see any postings from Rich Rosen, or that feature the word ``abortion'' in the title.
- A column by Mr. Protocol (Michael O'Brien) in Sun Expert magazine (now called Server/Workstation Expert) used the word "Rosenesque" to describe a person who produces a substantial volume of e-mail messages large enough to overwhelm a local network.
- The Net.Legends FAQ says:
  How can a Net.Legends list omit Rich Rosen? I think he still holds the record for amount of spontaneous, germane text in a single newsgroup (net.philosophy).
- In contrast, one system administrator wrote an article entitled "Proposed deletion of Rich Rosen":
  If net.bizarre and net.flame were threats to the network's continued existence, then Rich Rosen is doubly so. ... Rich Rosen's volume is enormous. His postings comprise two percent of the network's volume. ... Expressed as a raw number of bytes per week, the number is horrendous. It is impossible for one man to produce this much cogent thought in a week. Speaking only for myself (perhaps a poor comparison) I don't think I could even type that fast. ... Due to his high volume and near-total lack of redeeming value, I propose that Rich Rosen be removed from USENET. In order to preserve the usual facade of democracy, I'm doing this as a poll. ...
- On the other hand, an article by Thomas Richardson from 1995 said:
  Rosen was particularly noteworthy, because he posted pages [and] pages of coherent material in just about every group I read. ... This was back when you could read the entire Usenet feed in a single afternoon. That doesn't explain how Rosen managed to post on every subject, though. I think he must have been a speed typist or he must have had some kind of augmented metabolism or something. ... He also managed to stay coherent and to largely avoid repeating himself. Maybe there really was no Rich Rosen. Maybe Dennis Ritchie was just playing a weird joke on everybody.

== Post-Bellcore (1990s) ==
Rosen left Bellcore in 1989, but continued to post occasionally to Usenet from various outside accounts. He was one of the early members of the Panix user community in New York through the mid-1990s. He hosted his own popular "Monty Python home page" that was cited by both Lycos and the Global Network Navigator.

During the latter part of the 1990s, Rosen worked at Pencom Web Works with Leon Shklar, with whom he would later collaborate on Web Application Architecture: Principles, Protocols, and Practices, a widely used textbook for senior and graduate level college courses in Web application development.

== Later life ==
Rosen lives once again in New Jersey with his wife, Celia. He "retired" from posting to Usenet but maintained his own blog, writing on the subject of web application development, including articles for various online and print journals, while also working with Leon Shklar on a second edition of Web Application Architecture. In addition, he contributed material to the fourth edition of Mac OS X for Unix Geeks which was published in 2008. He continues to record his own music, some of which was accessible on his website.

== Publications ==
- Web Application Architecture: Principles, Protocols and Practices, 2nd edition, Leon Shklar, Rich Rosen, 2009, Wiley, ISBN 978-0-470-51860-1.
- Mac OS X Leopard for Unix Geeks, 4th edition, Ernest E. Rothman, Brian Jepson, Rich Rosen, 2008, O'Reilly, ISBN 978-0-596-52062-5.
