= Steven M. Rosen =

American philosopher

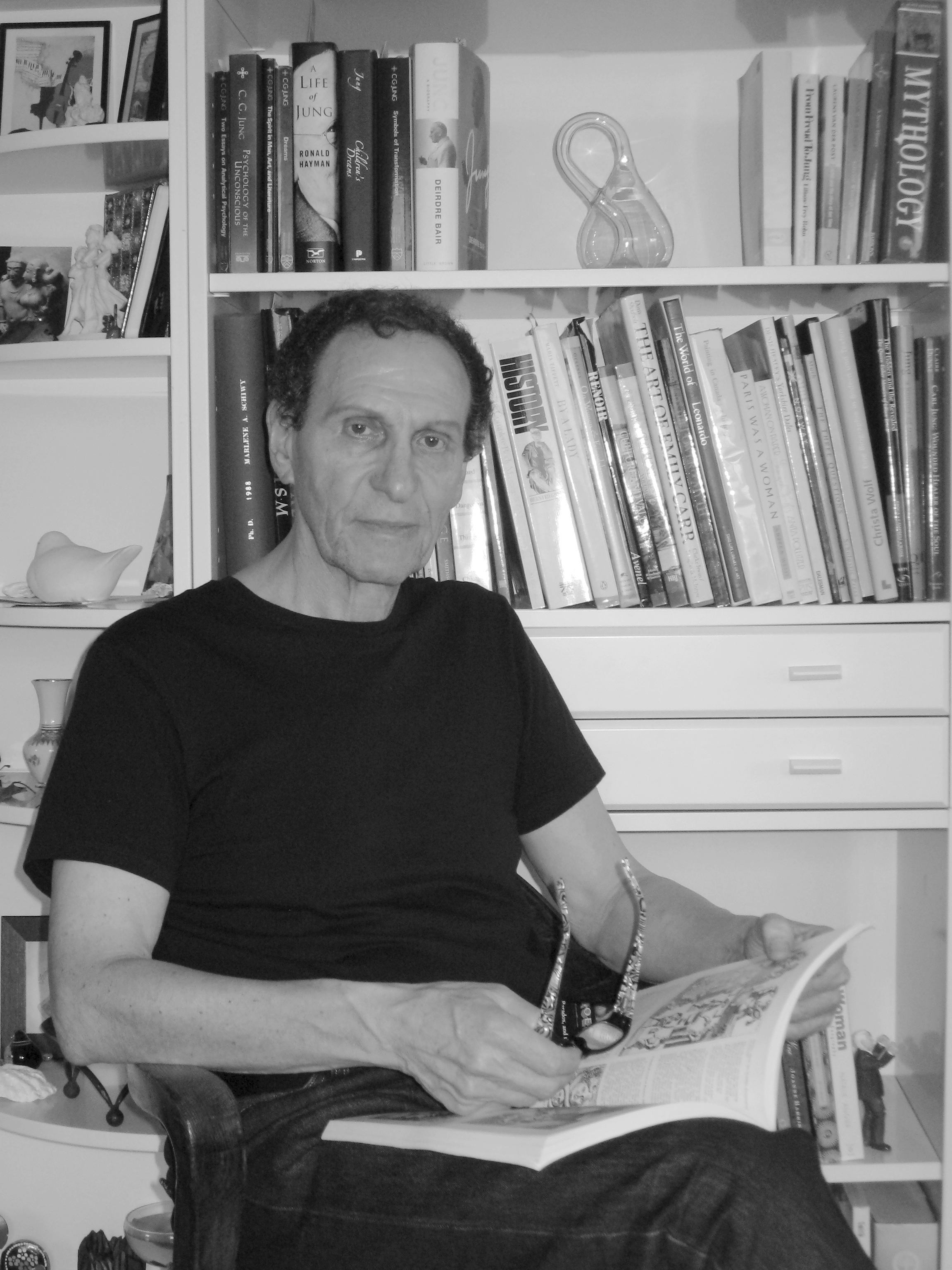
Steven M. Rosen, philosopher and psychologist, in 2014

Steven M. Rosen (born September 6, 1942) is an American-Canadian philosopher and psychologist, currently based in Vancouver, British Columbia. His writings focus on issues concerning phenomenological ontology, the philosophy and poetics of science, Jungian thought, the gender question, ecological change, and cultural transformation.

Rosen's books include Dreams, Death, Rebirth (Asheville, NC: Chiron Publications, 2014), The Self-Evolving Cosmos (Hackensack, NJ: World Scientific Publishing, 2008), Topologies of the Flesh (Athens, Ohio: Ohio University Press, 2006), Dimensions of Apeiron (Amsterdam-New York: Editions Rodopi, 2004), Science, Paradox, and the Moebius Principle (Albany, N.Y.: State University of New York Press, 1994) and The Moebius Seed (Walpole, N.H.: Stillpoint Publications, 1985).

Steven M. Rosen taught psychology and philosophy at the College of Staten Island of the City University of New York from 1970 to 2000.
