= Stan Rosen =

American football player (1906–1984)

Profile
- Positions: Halfback, quarterback

Personal information
- Born: March 28, 1906; New York, New York, U.S.
- Died: July 28, 1984 (aged 78); Claremont, New Hampshire, U.S.
- Listed height: 5 ft 6 in (1.68 m)
- Listed weight: 155 lb (70 kg)

Career information
- High school: New Utrecht (NY)
- College: Rutgers

Career history
- Buffalo Bisons (1929)

Career statistics
- Games: 8

Stanley "Tex" Rosen (March 28, 1906 – July 23, 1984) was an American football player. He was Jewish.

He played college football as a halfback and quarterback for Rutgers from 1926 to 1928, and was captain of the 1928 Rutgers Queensmen football team. He also played at second base for the Rutgers baseball team and competed in the pole vault for the track team.

He later professional football in the National Football League (NFL) as a back for the Buffalo Bisons. He appeared in eight NFL games, two as a starter, during the 1929 season.
