= Steven A. Rosen =

American-born Israeli archaeologist (born 1954)

Steven A Rosen
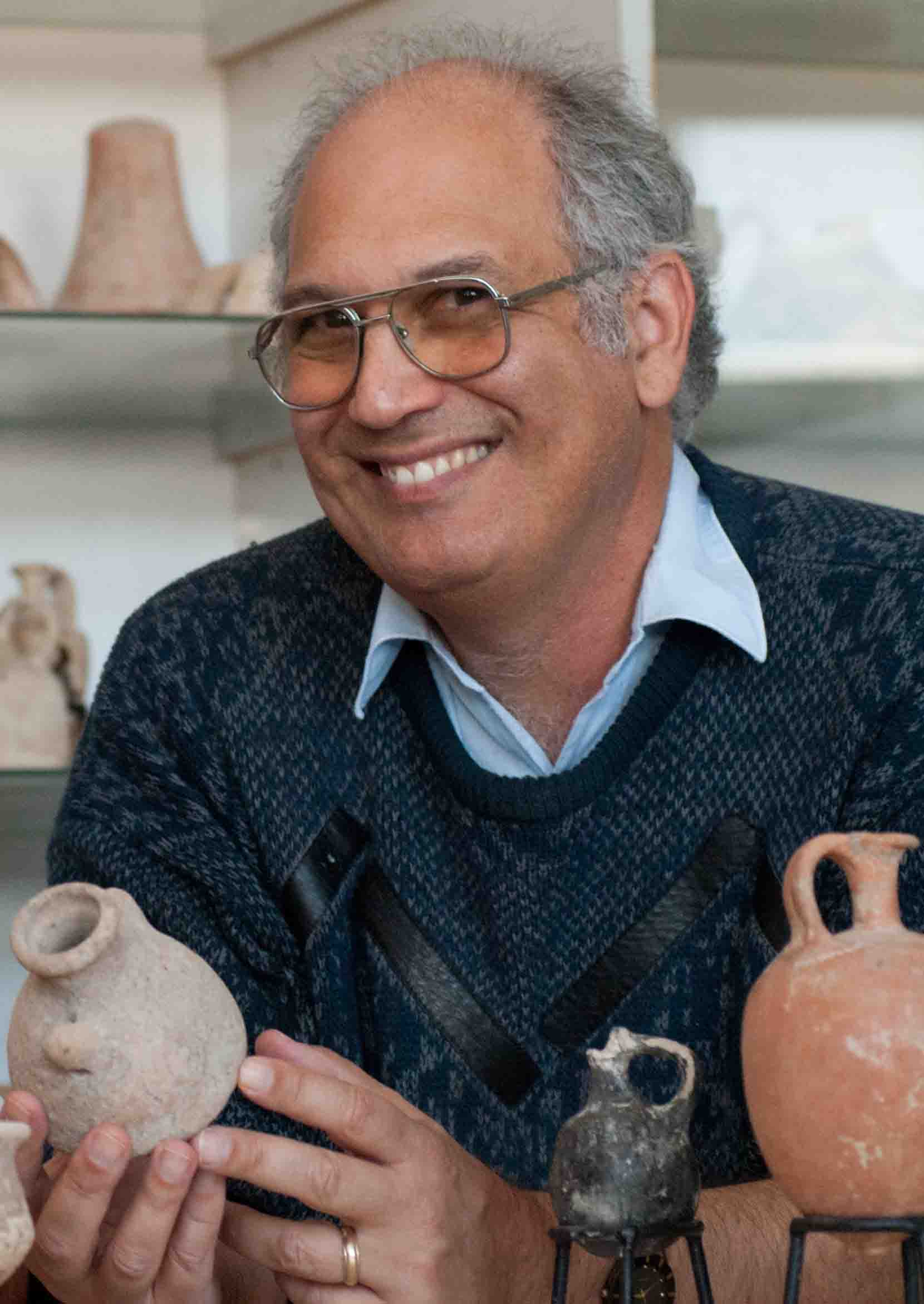
- Born: 1954 (age 71–72); United States
- Scientific career
- Fields: Archaeology
- Institutions: Ben-Gurion University of the Negev
- Doctoral advisor: Karl Butzer
- Website: bgu.academia.edu/SteveRosen

Steven A Rosen (Steve Rosen) is the emeritus Canada Chair in Near Eastern Archaeology in the Archaeological Division of the Department of Bible, Archaeology and Ancient Near East at Ben-Gurion University of the Negev. He also had served as the Vice President for External Affairs. His research has focused on two general areas, the continued use of chipped stone tools in the periods during which metals were already exploited (the Chalcolithic, Bronze, and Iron Ages), and the archaeology of mobile pastoralists, using the Negev (the southern desert of Israel) as an in-depth case study.

== Academic and public service ==
Rosen has accepted numerous roles in academic administration. He served as program head for the Archaeological Division within the Department of Bible, Archaeology, and Ancient Near East, later serving as chair of the department. He was director of the Humphrey Institute for Social Research, assistant dean of the Kreitman School for Advanced Studies, Deputy Rector (vice provost), and Vice President for External Affairs. He has served on numerous committees, including various disciplinary courts (both student and faculty), promotions committees, search committees, and space allocation committees.

== Research and students ==
General research has focused on stone tool analysis and desert archaeology, with more general interests in prehistoric archaeology and Near Eastern archaeology. Rosen’s work on the use of stone tools during the Metal Ages has pioneered the study of this entire realm of material culture, demonstrating how the study of stone tools traditionally considered a relict of earlier technologies was integral to Bronze and Iron Age societies. This work culminated in the publication of Lithics After the Stone Age, which won the G.E. Wright Publication Prize of the American Schools of Oriental Research in the following year. Rosen continues to train students in the analysis of stone tool assemblages and recent work has continued to expand on related subjects such as the economics and functions of later period stone tools.

The study of mobile desert pastoralists has traditionally been assumed to be inaccessible to standard archaeological methods. Rosen’s work, based on intensive survey in the Central Negev and excavations and analyses of about a dozen camps and small campsites dating from the introduction of domesticated herd animals into the desert more than 8000 years ago and up until recent times, has demonstrated that adopting the methods of prehistoric archaeology offers an effective way of addressing the relative paucity of remains from campsites and rock shelters used as stabling sites. Of particular note is the work he has conducted on stabling rock shelters filled with ancient dung layers and cult sites. His most recent book, Revolutions in the Desert: the Rise of Mobile Pastoral Societies in the Negev and the Arid Zones of the Southern Levant summarizes the evolution of these societies in the Negev and surrounding regions. An earlier volume, An Investigation into Early Desert Pastoralism: Excavations at the Camel Site, Negev offers a case study of the excavation of just such a camp site, dating from ca. 3000 BCE.

Rosen has advised some 25 research students (M.A. and Ph.D.) and post-docs from Israel, the USA, the Netherlands, France, and the United Kingdom. His students have worked on a wide range of subjects including stone tool analysis, settlement patterns, the archaeology of desert pastoralism, Negev archaeology, antiquities law, rock art, and ethnoarchaeology.
