= Kelly Rosen =

Estonian footballer

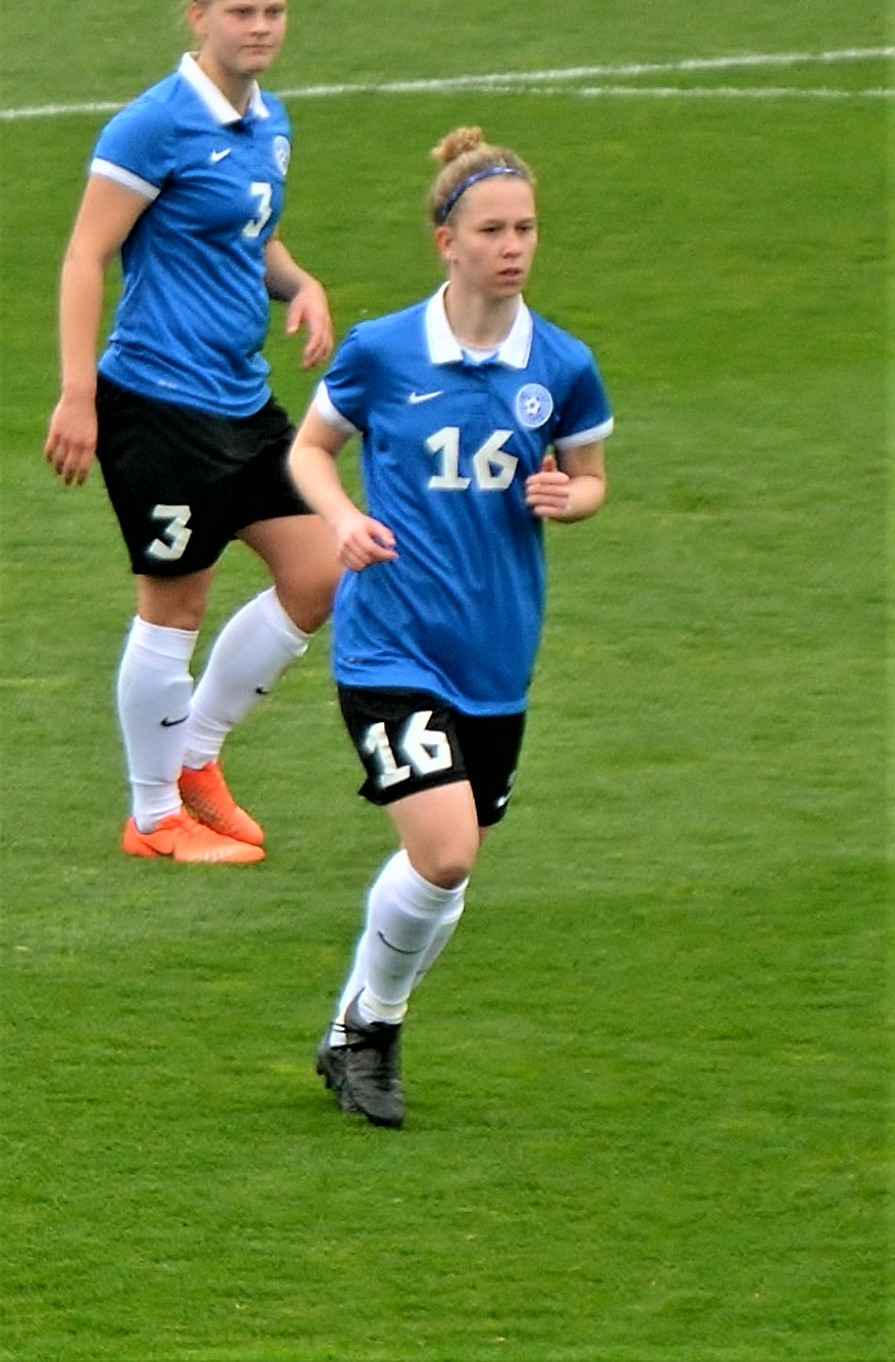
- Rosen playing for Estonia national in 2018.

Personal information
- Full name: Kelly Rosen
- Date of birth: 23 November 1995 (age 30)
- Place of birth: Estonia
- Position: Midfielder

Team information
- Current team: Flora Tallinn

Youth career
- Flora Tallinn

Senior career*
Years	Team	Apps	(Gls)
2011–	Flora Tallinn		

International career^{‡}
2011–2012	Estonia U17	6	(0)
2012–2014	Estonia U19	23	(2)
2014–	Estonia	101	(1)
- * Club domestic league appearances and goals ‡ National team caps and goals as of 19 April 2026

Kelly Rosen (born 23 November 1995) is an Estonian women's association football, who plays as a midfielder for Naiste Meistriliiga club Flora Tallinn and the Estonia women's national football team.

== International goals ==
No.	Date	Venue	Opponent	Score	Result	Competition
1.	11 March 2017	Parekklisia Stadium, Parekklisia, Cyprus	Bahrain	2–0	3-0	Aphrodite Cup
