= Joseph A. Rosen =

Russian-born American agronomist

- Иосиф Борисович Розен (Russian)

Personal details
- Born: Iosiph Borisovich Rozen; 1877 Moscow, Russian Empire
- Died: 3 April 1949 New York, United States
- Citizenship: Russian (1877–?); American (?–1949)
- Party: Russian Social Democratic Labour Party (1898–1903)
- Spouse: Katherine N. née Shubina
- Children: Nata Rosen; Eugene Rosen (Paris); Leo Rosen (Boston)

Joseph A. Rosen (born Joseph Borisovich Rosen, 1877 – April 3, 1949) is an American agronomist of Russian Jewish origin. He was head of the Russian branch of the American Jewish Joint Distribution Committee from 1924 to 1938.

== Biography ==
Rosen was born in Moscow. His father was the owner of a dye-house in Tula. He studied at Moscow University. He was sentenced to exile in Siberia for participating in a revolutionary group. He was a member of the Russian Social Democratic Labour Party within the Menshevik faction. He fled from exile to Germany at the age of 17, where he studied at the agricultural department of the Heidelberg University. He emigrated to the US in 1903 and worked in agriculture for two years. He continued his education at the Michigan Agricultural College from 1905 to 1908, where he received a master's degree in agriculture. He received a Ph.D. in agrochemistry from the University of Minnesota.

== Career ==
He developed a new variety of winter rye in 1910, which was named after him ("Rosen Rye") and became widespread on American farms. Under his leadership, an agronomic center was created in Minneapolis, with a branch in Yekaterinoslav, and later in Kharkiv. The purpose of this center was to train agronomists from the Russian Empire in the skills and techniques of highly productive agriculture. He was head of the agricultural department in the New York office of the Petrograd International Commercial Bank from 1915 to 1918. He was also head of the agricultural colony of the Jewish Colonisation Association, created by Baron Maurice de Hirsch, in Woodbine, New Jersey.

He became the envoy of the Joint Distribution Committee in Russia in 1921 and their representative in the American Relief Administration. He was director of the Agro-Joint Corporation from 1924 to 1938, which aimed to transform Soviet Jews, mainly "Lishenets", into peasants. Rosen believed that the secret of a happy future for the Jewish people under Soviet rule was in productive labor. He directed a program to relocate German Jewish doctors from Nazi Germany to the Soviet Union. Subsequently, at least 14 of them were repressed by the NKVD, and their families were partially expelled.

During the Great Purge, at least 30 employees of Agro-Joint were repressed, and 70 people were convicted in the Agro-Joint case. Rosen's name featured in many cases not directly related to the JDC. A Moscow rabbi Shmarya Yehuda Leib Medalia was accused of receiving money from Rosen to distribute to the poor. Other members of this Moscow religious community (Meyer Rabinovich, Emanuil Sheptovitsky, and others) were also accused of distributing money from him. Two of Rosen's deputies for the Agro-Joint, Ezekiel Groer and Samuil Lyubarsky, were arrested. (1878–1938). Their relatives were told that both of them were sentenced to "ten years without the right to correspond". Rosen decided to take charge, and sent a letter from Paris to the NKVD on December 16, 1937:

"Through the wives of German Jewish doctors who were expelled from the USSR, who at one time had the opportunity to go to the Soviet Union to work in their specialty with the assistance of our organization, I learned that the NKVD had arrested several of our employees. As the director of Agro-Joint, I consider it my duty to declare that if any illegal actions are found in the work of our organization in the USSR, then I am personally responsible for them, and not our employees and not my deputies. I hereby ask you to give me the opportunity to testify to the relevant Soviet authorities on all issues related to the activities of our organization in the USSR, and I agree in advance not to resort to the protection of any diplomatic sources, since the matter concerns me personally"

According to Groer's daughter, Rosen met with Stalin's confidante, Vyacheslav Molotov, but Molotov said that he could not do anything, since the duo had already confessed to everything. In fact, both Groer and Lyubarsky had already been shot, on March 15, 1938, and September 1, 1938, respectively.)

On behalf of the JDC, he investigated the possibility of establishing settlements for Jewish refugees from Europe in British Guyana and the Dominican Republic in 1939. A street in Santo Domingo is named after Rosen. He died April 3, 1949, in New York.

== Personal life ==
He married Ekaterina Nikanorovna Shubina.

== Sources ==
- Краткая еврейская энциклопедия. Т. 7. Кол. 253–254.
- Мицель Михаил. «Последняя глава». Агро-Джойнт в годы большого террора. Киев: Дух и Литера. 2012.
- Розен Джозеф А. // статья из Электронной еврейской энциклопедии
- Guide to the Papers of Joseph A. Rosen (1877—1949), 1911—1943 (bulk 1922—1938)
- Dr. Joseph Rosen, Agro-joint Director Who Resettled 250,000 Jews in Russia, Dies in N. Y.
