= Gerald H. Rosen =

American mathematical physicist (b. 1933)

Gerald Harris Rosen
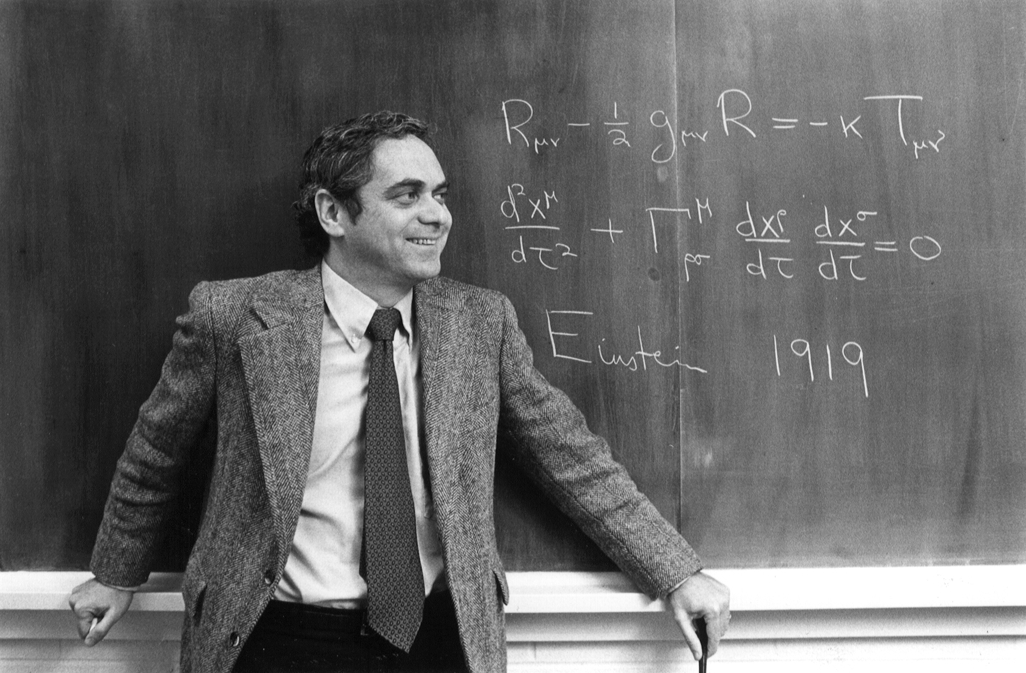
- Teaching physics at Drexel University
- Born: August 10, 1933 (age 93); Mount Vernon, New York
- Education: Princeton University
- Occupation: theoretical physicist
- Years active: since 1958
- Known for: Logarithmic Schrödinger equation Orbital motion limited (OML) theory Rosen equation Rosen's action integral
- Scientific career
- Workplaces: Drexel University
- Thesis: On the quantum theory of general relativity (1959)

Gerald Harris Rosen (born August 10, 1933, Mt. Vernon, New York) is an American mathematical scientist with over 280 published contributions in leading international scientific journals since 1958, in the areas of theoretical physics, mathematical biology, and aeronautical engineering. Rosen is the M. R. Wehr Professor Emeritus at Drexel University, in Philadelphia, Pennsylvania, United States.

== Education ==
At Mt. Vernon's High School, he earned varsity letters in track and football as a sprinter. He graduated first in the Class of 1951. Subsequently, at Princeton University, he majored in Engineering-Physics, winning the Sophomore Math Contest (1953), the Whiton Engineering-Physics Scholarship (1953), the Guggenheim Jet Propulsion Scholarship (1954), the Alton Prize (1955), and a 3-year National Science Foundation Pre-doctoral Fellowship (1955). He graduated first in the Class of 1955 of 729 students.

At Princeton University, Rosen received the degrees B.S.E. in 1955, M.A. in 1956, and PhD in 1959.

== Career ==
Rosen was an NSF postdoctoral fellow in 1959 at the Institute for Theoretical Physics in Stockholm, Sweden, returning to the United States in 1960 to serve as a consultant to the Joint Chiefs of Staff. In 1962, as principal scientist at Martin-Marietta, he derived an equation, later known as Electrodynamic Tether (OML Theory). OML Theory has been independently rediscovered by other mathematical physicists more than 30 years later. Between 1963 and 1966, he did research at the Southwest Research Institute in San Antonio, Texas. Among the important research papers composed during this period was: "Particle-like Solutions to Nonlinear Scalar Wave Theories", Journal of Math. Phys., Vol. 6, p. 1269 (1965), which has been resurrected recently by Russian theoreticians; see publication 32 at Gerald Rosen's website.

In 1966, he accepted a tenured professorship at Drexel University in Philadelphia where he remains on the research faculty in Physics as the M. R. Wehr Professor Emeritus. His most important recent works pertain to the masses of leptons and quarks (pubs. 270 and 272), and to dark energy and matter (pubs. 273 and 274).

=== Books ===
- Gerald H. Rosen (1969). Formulations of Classical and Quantum Dynamical Theory. Academic Press. ISBN 978-0080955698.
- Gerald H. Rosen (1990). A New Science of Stock Market Investing: How to Predict Stock Price Movements Consistently and Profitably. Ballinger Pub Co. ISBN 978-0887303937.
