= Marion Rosen =

German-American physiotherapist (1914–2012)

- Born: June 24, 1914; Nuremberg, Kingdom of Prussia, German Empire
- Died: January 18, 2012 (aged 97); Berkeley, California, U.S.
- Occupation: Physiotherapist
- Known for: Rosen Method

Marion Rosen (June 24, 1914 – January 18, 2012) was a German-American physiotherapist. She developed Rosen Method Bodywork and Rosen Method Movement. Under Rosen's guidance in 1980, the Rosen Institute (RI) was formed as the governing international organization that protects and sustains the quality and standards of Rosen Method. The Rosen Institute has affiliate training centers in 16 countries and has certified 1150 bodywork practitioners and 150 movement teachers.

== Personal history ==
Rosen was born in Nuremberg, Germany in 1914. Marion Rosen was training in massage and breath work in Germany by Lucy Heyer-Grote, a student of Elsa Gindler, who is considered to be an originator of somatic practices that utilize the breath, the body and awareness. Gindler, Rosen and Heyer-Grote provided breath work, massage and relaxation to patients receiving Jungian psychoanalysis. These formative experiences of the interplay between body and mind influenced Rosen's unique perspective on employing bodywork and relaxation to help clients find the link between their physical pain, muscle tension and their psychosocial history and experiences of trauma.

Her Jewish heritage impelled Rosen to leave Germany in the 1930s. She went on to train in physical therapy in Sweden and at the Mayo Clinic in the United States, and then settled in Berkeley, California. Over many decades in private practice, she integrated her mind-body training with her physical therapy knowledge, gaining a reputation among physicians and therapists for helping individuals who did not improve through tractional treatments. In her 70-year career as a physiotherapist, Rosen cared for between 30,000 and 40,000 patients. Marion Rosen continued to teach, hold workshops, and see patients until she suffered a stroke in late 2011. She died at 97 years old on January 18, 2012, in Berkeley.

== Early development of the Rosen Method ==
Through her training with Elsa Gindler's student Lucy Heyer in the 1930s and long career as a physical therapist, Rosen developed a particular approach to the body and eventually began teaching it to others. She synthesized her approach into a system of Rosen Method Bodywork, in which a practitioner identifies and works on areas of habitual muscular tension in the client; and movement, which involves a series of gentle movements done to music, as a form of preventative physiotherapy.

The Rosen Method of Bodywork developed from Rosen's clinical work with physical therapy clients whose muscular pain and restriction improved, only to recur sometime later. Rosen's decades of clinical observation led her to conclude that the body holds emotional memories and responses in unconscious, habitual patterns of muscle tension and restricted breathing. Her conceptualization of this link between chronic pain, tension and unresolved emotional experiences from life-history trauma underlies Rosen's method.

Rosen observed that when using gentle, non-manipulative touch and reflective words to relax patterns of muscle tension, her patients were able to observe feelings in their bodies, including sensations, memories, images and emotions. As her patients became aware of, and talked about, the emotional reasons underlying their pain and physical limitations, they were able to achieve lasting benefit. Rosen emphasized that a safe therapeutic alliance was necessary in order for her patients to perceive and describe sensations in their bodies. Rosen further observed that as her patients' breathing muscles regained their full range of movement, a spiritual sense of connection with something greater than themselves often became available to them.

IN 1956, Rosen developed a series of preventative physical therapy exercises for clients who wanted to optimize their well-being. Done in a group and set to music, these movements gently and systematically improve range of movement and joint lubrication. Rosen method movement is unique in its use of rhythmic music which inspires movement, its focus on "sensing from within" to cultivate embodied self-awareness, its encouragement of easeful, natural breathing, and supportive and enlivening group interaction.

Rosen trained her movement teachers to place an emphasis on embodied self-awareness. Clients are guided to feel the movements arise from within their bodies, to notice how the movements free their breath, and how the movements increase their range of motion. Teachers collaborate with participants to relax muscles into their natural length, improve dynamic body alignment and allow natural expressiveness, which prepares participants for ease in ordinary movements, as well as for more strenuous exercise.

== Modern Rosen Method ==
Rosen Method Bodywork practitioners employ a synthesis of attention to the patterns of the breath, gentle touch that listens and responds to shifts in muscle tension, and reflective words that increase clients' embodied self-awareness. Rosen Method bodywork practitioners are trained to cultivate a collaborative therapeutic relationship based on close attention to clients' physical and emotional responses in order to facilitate the safe release of unconscious emotional pain and facilitate the relaxation of physical pain and restriction.

Contemporary neuroscience research confirms Rosen's fundamental observation: improved body-mind awareness within a safe therapeutic alliance enhances healing by shifting the nervous system from states of pain avoidance to states of pain acceptance, relaxation and resolution. Research confirms that embodied self-awareness improves resilience in coping with stress, lowers anxiety and other psychiatric symptoms, and improves overall health by reducing inflammation in body tissues.

== Notable works ==
- Rosen, M. and S. Brenner. (2003). Rosen Method Bodywork: Accessing the unconscious through touch. North Atlantic Books
- Rosen, M. and S. Brenner. (1991). Rosen Method Movement. North Atlantic Books.
