= Louis Rosen =

American physicist

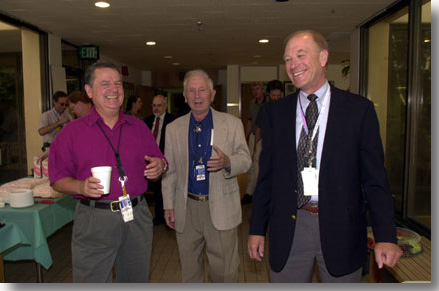
John C. Browne, Louis Rosen, and Paul Lisowski (LANSCE division leader) in 2002

Louis Rosen (June 10, 1918 – August 15, 2009) was a nuclear physicist, the "father" of the Los Alamos Neutron Science Center accelerator (LAMPF, now known as LANSCE).

Dr. Rosen held a bachelor's degree and a master's degree from the University of Alabama and a Doctorate in Physics from Pennsylvania State University. He had never taken a course in Nuclear Physics before arriving in Los Alamos.

During World War II, Rosen worked in the Manhattan Project.

== Career ==
While most of his colleagues at Los Alamos did not stay, Rosen remained there his entire career, and was still working there two days before his death.

He initiated and led an effort to build in Los Alamos what was then the most intense atom smasher in the world, LAMPF. It accelerated a beam of protons to create an intense beam of pi meson (pion) particles. It was 1000 times more powerful than any previously existing particle accelerator, and was used to study the interaction of pions with other nuclear materials. He called his machine "a badly needed bridge between subnuclear and nuclear physics".

== Personal life ==
Dr. Rosen's wife Mary (née Terry), to whom he was married for sixty years, died in 2004.

Rosen was awarded the Ernest Orlando Lawrence Award in 1963. Other awards included the Guggenheim Fellowship and, in 2002, the Los Alamos National Laboratory medal.

== Death ==
Dr. Rosen died of a subdural hematoma in Albuquerque, New Mexico, on August 15, 2009, reported by his granddaughter Ambyr Hardy. He was survived by his brother, Bernard; two grandchildren; and four great grandchildren.
