= Frank Rosen =

South African artist (1918–1998)

Frank Rosen (1918–1998) was a South African artist.

== Early life ==
He was born 1 August 1918. He was an athletic youth and fought in the British Army during WWII, in the North Africa Campaign as a tank driver. He was injured and sent for treatment in Italy. There he witnessed work by many Italian painters. He became a painter in Naples in 1944.

He returned to South Africa after the war and set up a business as a Certified Public Accountant. He sold the business in 1955 to enrol at The Central School of Art and Craft (later the Central School of Art and Design) where he studied in 1955 and 1957/1958.^{[1].} He moved to England permanently in 1960/61 and bought a house on Hampstead Lane, London.

== Career ==
During his early period he exhibited at:

- Alder Gallery, Johannesburg - 1959
- ZOA Hall, Tel Aviv - 1959/60
- Artists House, Jerusalem - 1960

He showed an exhibition of 30 paintings at Qantas Gallery in London n December 1962. The program had an introduction by Pierre Rouve. Other exhibitions included:

- Third Grand Prix International, Monte Carlo - 1962
- São Paulo Biennial, Brazil - 1961
- Kunstzaal Plaats, The Hague - 1958
- Amsterdam - 1958
- Royal Academy, London - 1958 and 59
- Paris Salon - 1962
- Munich - 1961
- Throughout Yugoslavia 1961
- Throughout South Africa - 1958/62
- Salisbury, Rhodesia - 1958
- He exhibited at the Reid, Redfern, Leicester and John Whibley Galleries in London during 1962.

He had a second individual exhibition was at the John Whibley Gallery in June 1973, showing his collection 'The Israeli Suite and Recent Paintings'.

A retrospective took place at the Museum of Science and Technology in California in 1979. The retrospective closed in 1984 and was said in a newspaper report to have been viewed by more than a million people.

According to newspaper articles in the early to mid-eighties, he divided his time between his summer residence in Hampstead, and his winter home in Palm Springs. He is noted for his lecture accompanied by his own film The Romantic Revival. He is also noted for his series Spirits of the Grand Canyon.

He is listed in the 1958 and 59 Royal Academy brochures as living in St John's Wood, London, before his permanent UK residency.

One of his paintings is in the collection of the Glasgow Museums Resource Centre titled The Knight and the Squire

A short biography was published by the Ben Uri Research Unit in early 2025. Ben Uri - Frank Rosen A digital exhibit was added to the Ben Uri Gallery website with a representative sample of the artists work. https://benuri.org/exhibitions/98-frank-rosen/works/

He died in 1998.
