= Michel de Rosen =

French businessman (born 1951)

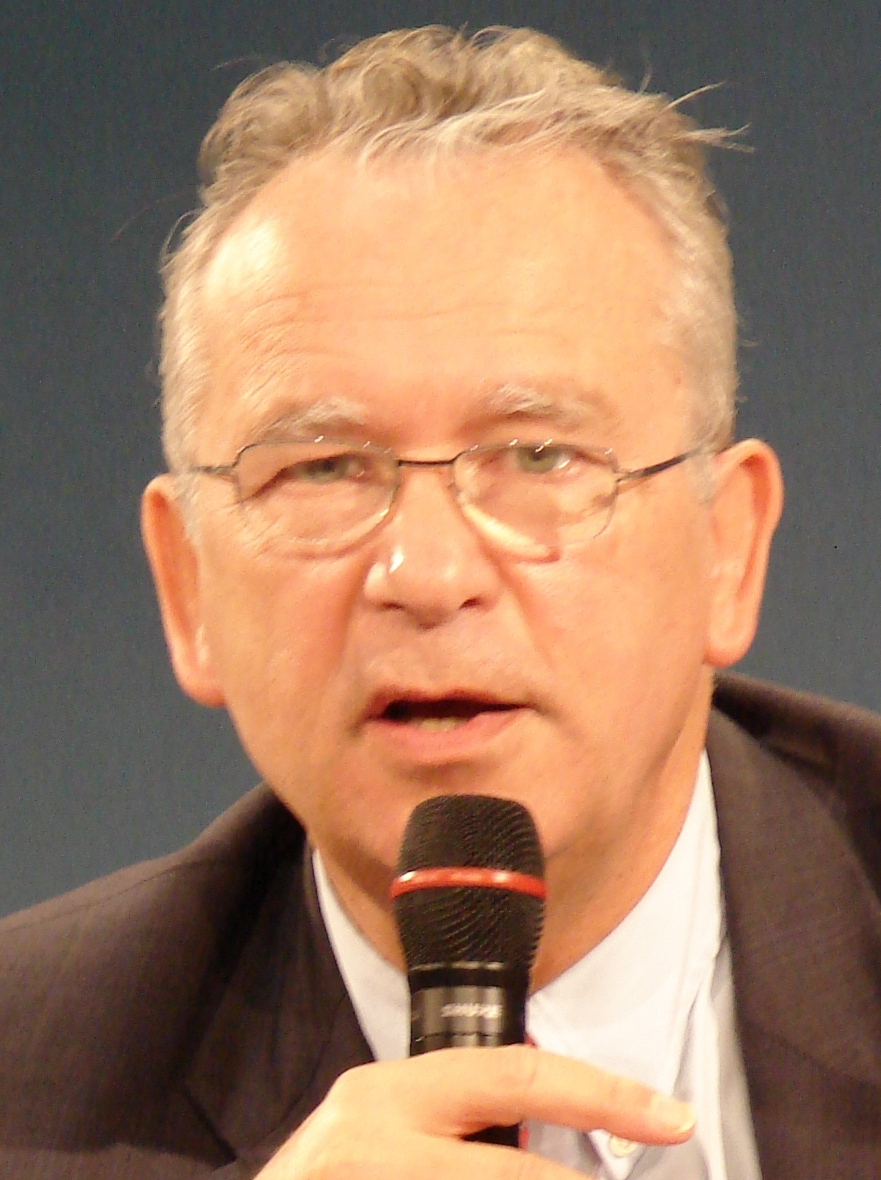
Michel de Rosen of Eutelsat

Michel de Rosen (born February 18, 1951) is the chairman of Faurecia and was the CEO of Eutelsat Communications from 2009 to 2016. He is a non-executive member of the board of directors of ABB. He was chief executive officer and chairman of the board of directors of ViroPharma from August 2002 to May 2008. From 1982 to 1999, de Rosen held several positions at Rhône-Poulenc (France) and Rhone-Poulenc Rorer (USA) (now Sanofi-Aventis), including chief executive officer from May 1995 until December 1999, and chairman of the board of directors from 1996 to 1999.

== Career ==
From 1976 to 1982 de Rosen was auditor at the French Ministries of Finance and Defense.

== Education ==
Michel de Rosen holds a Master of Business Administration from HEC Paris.

== Organizations ==
Michel de Rosen is or has been on a number of boards:

- ABB (director, since 2002);
- Aspen Institute (mentor)
- Global Business Coalition on HIV/AIDS (director)
- Gnosko Bio (advisor, since 2020)
- HTH Worldwide (advisor)
- InnaPhase Corporation (director, July 2000 - September 2004)
- Pennsylvania Bio (director)
- Ursinus College (trustee)

In an interview with the British newspaper The Sunday Telegraph on October 8, 1995, he was quoted as saying that he ... sees RPR as a mixture of 'hunting' – growing the company by swooping on acquisition 'prey' – and 'farming', less glamorous but vital organic growth and development of new drugs.
