= Gustaf-Fredrik von Rosen =

Swedish Army colonel and equestrian

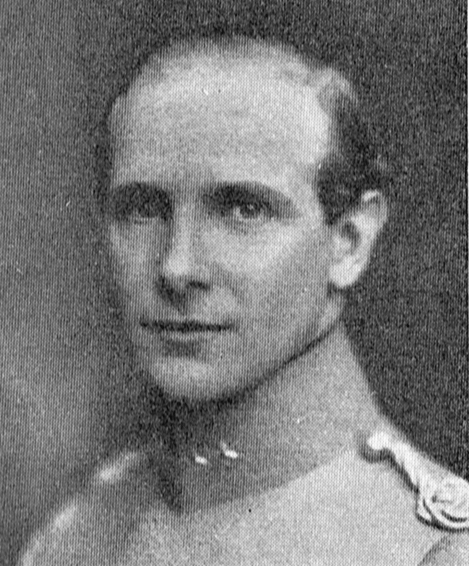
- Born: Gustaf-Fredrik Hans Göran von Rosen; 23 July 1895; Stockholm, Sweden
- Died: 2 January 1956 (aged 60); Sorunda, Sweden
- Military career
- Allegiance: Sweden
- Branch: Swedish Army
- Service years: 1915–1955
- Rank: Colonel
- Commands: Section III, Defence Staff

Count Gustaf-Fredrik Hans Göran von Rosen (23 July 1895 – 2 January 1956) was a Swedish Army colonel and equestrian.

== Early life ==
von Rosen was born on 23 July 1895 in Stockholm, Sweden, the son of Lieutenant General, Count Reinhold von Rosen and Elsa von Horn.

== Career ==
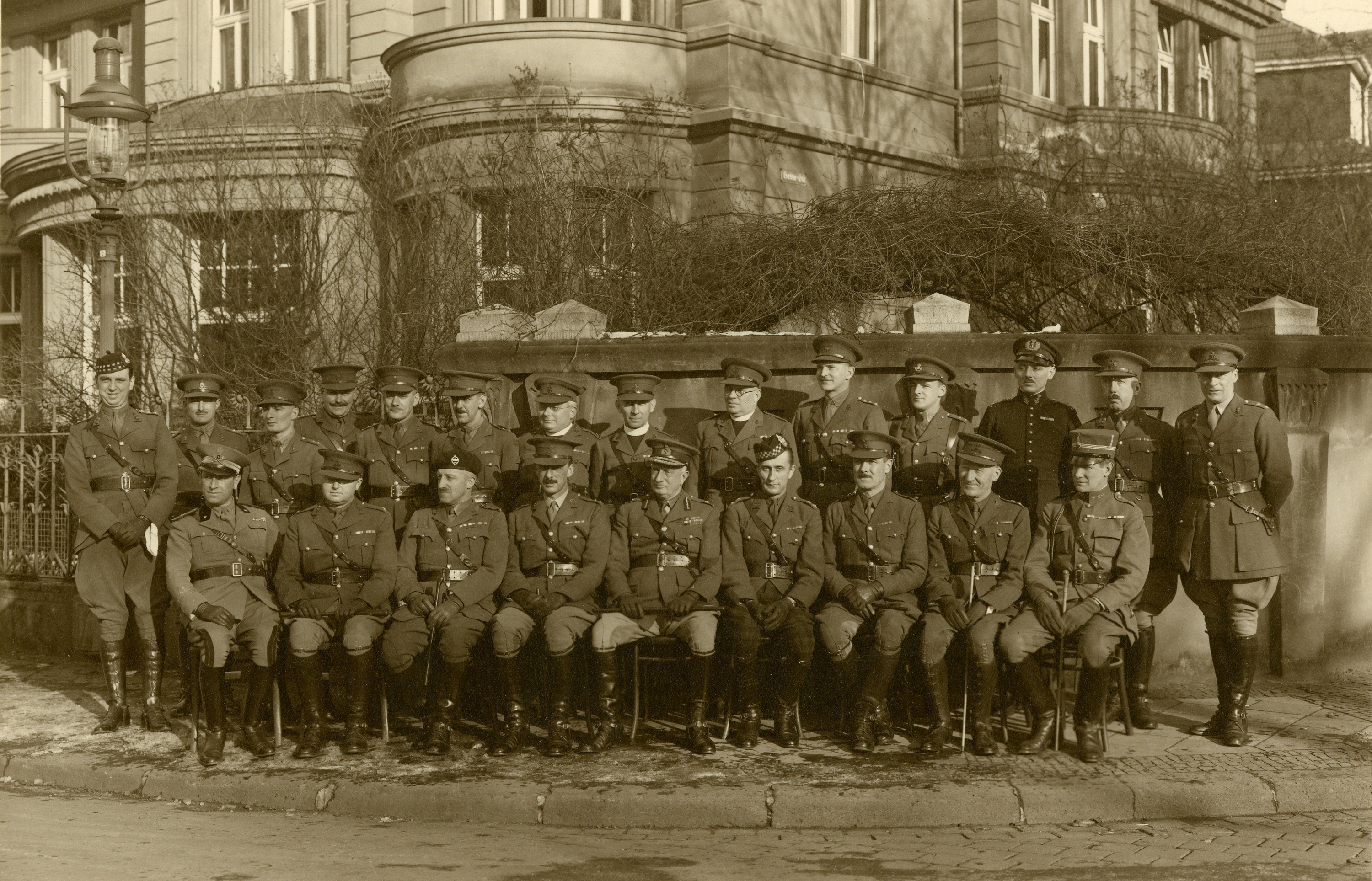
Captain von Rosen at the British headquarters in Saar.

Gustaf von Rosen was commissioned as a second lieutenant in the Life Guards of Horse (K 1) in 1915. He was promoted to lieutenant in 1918 and attended the Royal Swedish Army Staff College from 1921 to 1924. He was then an aspirant in the General Staff from 1926 to 1928 and he was promoted to ryttmästare in the Life Regiment of Horse (K 1) in 1930. Captain von Rosen served as an exchange officer in the German Reichswehr from 1930 to 1931 and as military attaché in Washington, D.C. from 1931 to 1932, as well as liaison officer between the British headquarters and the Swedish battalion during the referendum in Saar from 1934 to 1935. He was military attaché in London from 1938 to 1942 and he was promoted to major in 1940. Von Rosen was promoted to lieutenant colonel in 1942 and he served in Norrland Dragoon Regiment (K 4) from 1942 to 1944 and in the Life Regiment Hussars (K 3) from 1944 to 1945. He was promoted to colonel in 1945 and served as military attaché in Copenhagen from 1945 to 1948. Colonel von Rosen was head of department in the Defence Staff from 1947 to 1949 and head of Section III in the Defence Staff from 1949 to 1955.

He participated actively and successfully as a leader in domestic and foreign equestrian competitions and, until his sudden death in January 1956, had the main responsibility for organizing the equestrian olympics in Stockholm later that year. He was publisher of Kontakt med krigsmakten and a member of the Information Committee of the Swedish Armed Forces (Försvarets upplysningsnämnd) and the Swedish Armed Forces Welfare Committee for Personnel (Försvarets personalvårdsnämnd, FPVN). He was also a member of the inquiry into the salary benefits of foreign-stationed officials (Utredningen angående löneförmåner för utlandsstationerade tjänstemän) from 1949 to 1953. He also participated both actively and as a team leader in equestrian competitions in Sweden and abroad, including as a participant and member of the Swedish Equestrian Team in the United States in 1933, victorious in military equestrian competitions in Berlin in 1927, a member of the victorious Swedish Equestrian Team in New York City in 1933. von Rosen was chairman of Stockholm Riding Club (Stockholms ryttarförbund) from 1949 to 1952, Swedish Equestrian Federation (Svenska ridsportens centralförbund) from 1952.

== Personal life ==
In 1922, he married Countess Maud von Rosen (born 1902), the daughter of Crown Equerry Count Clarence von Rosen and Baroness Agnes von Blixen-Finecke. In 1938, he married Baroness Elsa Silfverschiöld (1910–1956), the daughter of Valet de chambre, Baron Otto Silfverschiöld and Ingeborg von Horn.

He was the owner of Fituna in Södertörn.

== Murder–suicide ==
On 2 January 1956, von Rosen first shot his wife and two children and then shot himself. The police investigation revealed that von Rosen's driver discovered the count's dead body on a balcony to the Fituna manor in Sorunda that von Rosen owned outside Stockholm. Immediately thereafter, Countess Elsa von Rosen, 45, was also discovered, and the two children, 16-year-old Gunilla and 10-year-old Gustaf Fredrik Jr. They were all dead in their beds, probably shot while asleep.

von Rosen is buried in Sorunda Cemetery in Sorunda, Nynäshamn Municipality.

== Dates of rank ==
- 1915 – Second lieutenant
- 1918 – Lieutenant
- 1930 – Ryttmästare
- 1940 – Major
- 1942 – Lieutenant colonel
- 1945 – Colonel

Military offices
Preceded by Curt Kempff	Section III of the Defence Staff; 1949–1955	Succeeded by ?
