= Roesen =

Roesen is a surname. Notable people with the surname include:

- Barbara Ann Roesen, married Anne Barton (1933−2013), American-English scholar and Shakespearean critic
- Brigitte Roesen (born 1944), German long jumper
- Jesper Roesen (born 1975), Danish taekwondo practitioner
- Severin Roesen (1816– after 1872), American painter
