= Eric Rosen (chess player) =

American chess player (born 1993)

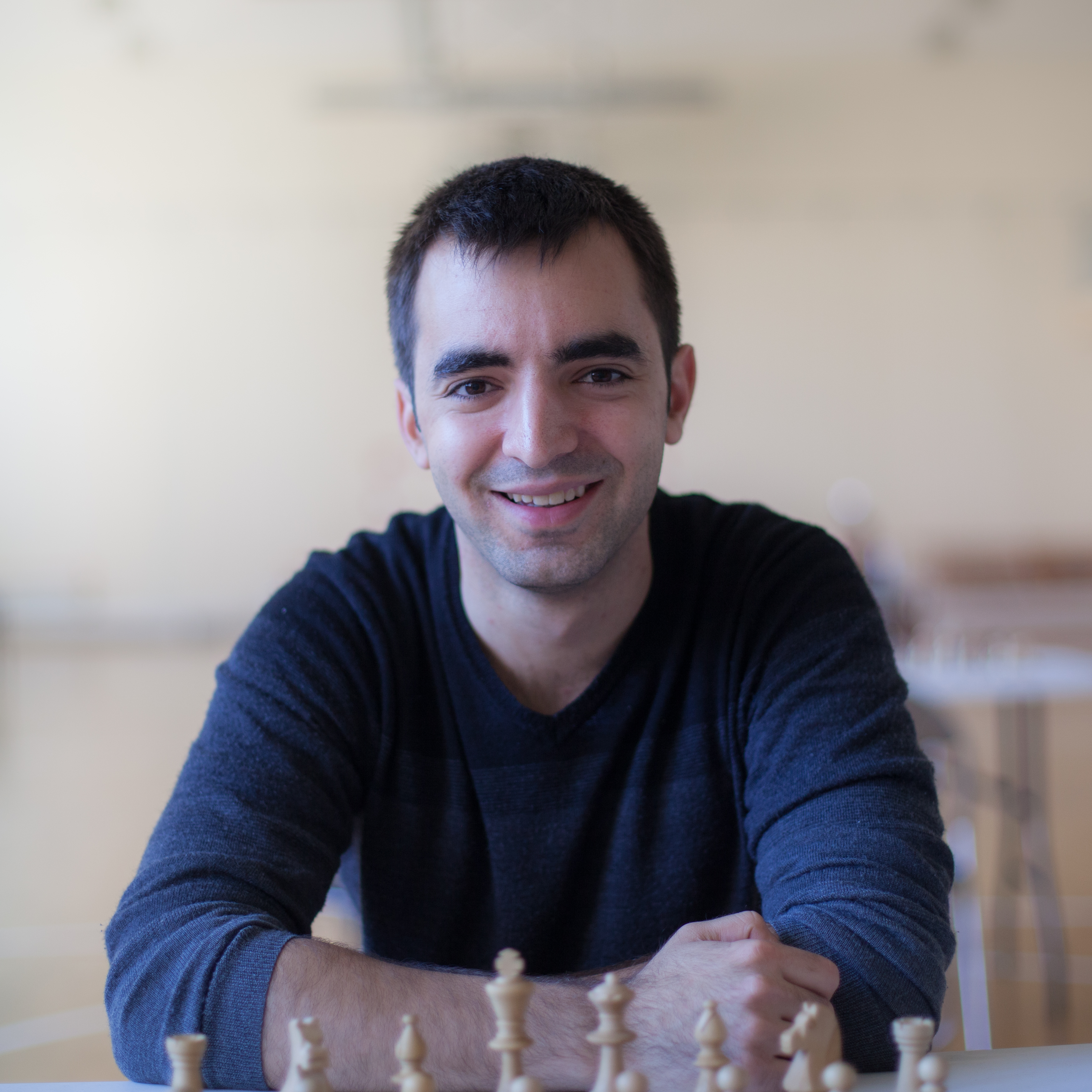
- Rosen in 2017

Personal information
- Born: September 3, 1993 (age 33)
- Spouse: Irene Kharisma Sukandar (m. 2025)

Chess career
- Country: United States
- Title: International Master (2015)
- FIDE rating: 2377 (September 2024)
- Peak rating: 2423 (June 2015)

Twitch information
- Channel: imrosen
- Years active: 2017–present
- Genre: Gaming
- Game: Chess
- Followers: 260,000

YouTube information
- Channel: Eric Rosen
- Years active: 2013–present
- Genre: Online chess
- Subscribers: 703,000
- Views: 222 million
- Last updated: August 8, 2025

Eric Rosen (born September 3, 1993) is an American chess player. He was awarded the FIDE Master title in 2011 and the International Master title in 2015. Rosen began playing chess as a child with his father and brother and became the United States Chess Federation (USCF) K12 national champion in 2011. While attending the University of Illinois, Rosen was on the chess team that secured a spot at the President's Cup in 2013 and 2014.

Rosen produces educational content on the online platforms Twitch and YouTube. While primarily known for his chess content, Rosen has also produced Scrabble livestreams and videos for his audience.

== Early life ==
Rosen was born on September 3, 1993, and grew up in Skokie, Illinois. He is Jewish. At the age of 7, he learned the rules of chess while on vacation in the Bahamas. Rosen's first major success came at age 9, when he won the Illinois 3rd Grade State Championship.

Attending Niles North High School, Rosen led the school's chess team to two state championships, and third place in nationals. In his junior year, Rosen won the 2011 U.S. K-12 Championship with a perfect 7–0 score, beating then-IM Marc Arnold in the final round. US Chess called his clean sweep "one of the outstanding individual achievements in this tournament's history", and the Skokie Village Board named May 16, 2011, Eric Rosen Day.

In 2011, Rosen achieved the title of FIDE Master by surpassing an Elo rating of 2300.

== Chess career ==
=== College ===
Rosen attended the University of Illinois at Urbana–Champaign for two years from 2012 to 2014, studying mathematics and computer science. He had been offered a full ride chess scholarship by the University of Texas at Dallas, but Rosen turned it down as it would have seen him playing for the B-Team. Instead, Michael Auger, the Illini Chess Club President and Rosen's future roommate, convinced him to study at Illinois.

In his freshman year, the team competed in the Pan-American Championships for the first time since the 1970s, and tied for first with four wins and two draws, after being seeded 14th. This took the team to the President's Cup, the Final Four of collegiate chess, for the first time since 1991. Rosen's team was the only college in the Final Four which did not offer chess scholarships, and the only team without a coach or Grandmaster. In a "fairy tale story", the team made it to the President's Cup again in 2014, after placing 3rd at the Pan-American Championships.

In 2015, Rosen transferred to Webster University on a chess scholarship. Webster had won the President's Cup in both of Rosen's previous appearances in that event. Playing for Webster University SPICE (Susan Polgar Institute for Chess Excellence), he was trained by Susan Polgar, the former Women's World Champion. In 2017, Rosen graduated from Webster University with a B.A. in Interactive Digital Media. He now lives in St. Louis, Missouri, not far from its renowned and eponymous chess club.

=== Individual ===
Rosen placed 9th in the 2011 World U-18 Championship in Caldas Novas, Brazil, with 6 out of 9 points, in doing so earning his first International Master norm.

From 2012 to early 2015, Rosen's FIDE rating stagnated at around 2300, dipping to 2259 in 2013. However, in June 2013, Rosen achieved his second IM norm, with a tied first-place finish at the 29th North American Masters in his hometown of Skokie, Illinois.

At the 9th Philadelphia Open in May 2015, Rosen gained 50 rating points and his third International Master norm after tying for first in the U2400 division. A month later, Rosen gained 51.4 rating points and a fourth IM norm after a 2nd-place finish at the 24th Chicago Open, with 6.5 out of 9 points. These two tournament performances took him to his peak FIDE rating of 2423. With his final IM norm won, and a rating over 2400, Rosen was awarded the title of International Master in September 2015 at the 86th FIDE Conference in Abu Dhabi, UAE.

In 2018 he unknowingly defeated reigning world champion Magnus Carlsen in a bullet game, while Carlsen was playing on a new account. In 2022 he won Chess.com's online I'M Not a GM Speed Chess Championship, whose 16 entrants were prominent chess players who did not have the grandmaster title.

On December 7, 2025, Rosen announced his marriage to Irene Kharisma Sukandar, an International Master and Woman Grandmaster.
