= David Rosen (politics) =

American political fundraiser

- Occupation: Political fundraiser
- Known for: Campaign finance director for Hillary Clinton (2000); acquitted in 2005

David Rosen is an American political fundraiser.

== Life ==
Rosen was employed as Hillary Clinton's campaign finance director in her campaign for a United States Senate seat in 2000. He was indicted on charges of false campaign finance reports related to the Hollywood Gala Salute to President William Jefferson Clinton in August 2000 while Clinton was First Lady of the United States. In 2005, a jury acquitted him of all the charges. Rosen served as campaign finance director in Pat Quinn's successful election campaign for Governor of Illinois in 2010.
