= David Rosen (artist) =

American artist

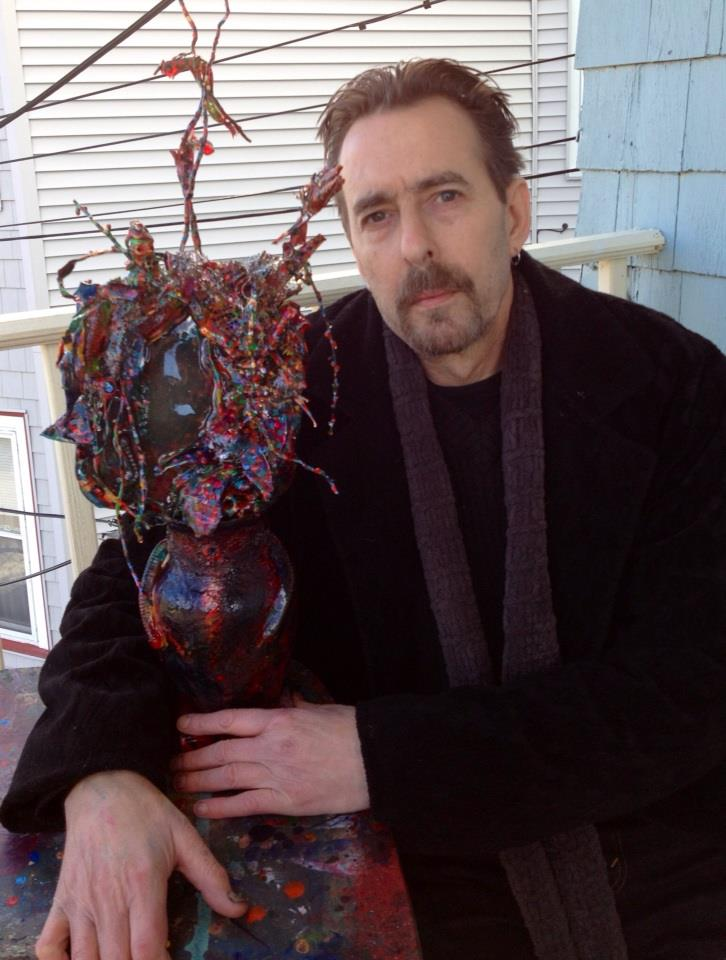
David Rosen on his porch in Somerville, holding the piece entitled "WITCH".

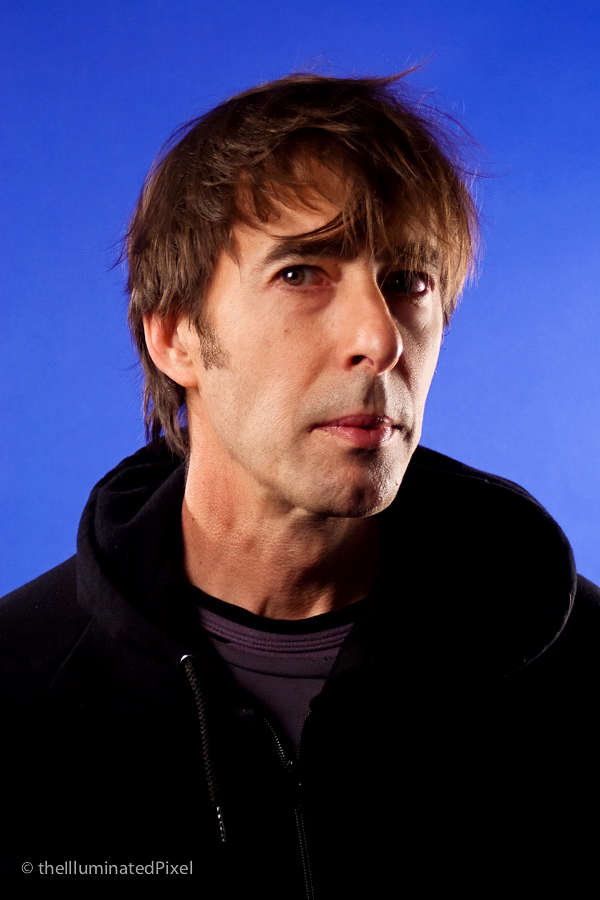
David Rosen in 2007

David Grant Rosen (26 November 1959 – 3 March 2014) was a South African fashion designer and artist. Trained as a painter, he is known primarily for his political fashion, art and activism, from his anti-apartheid designs in the 1980s to the Reason8 clothing label in the United States.

== Education ==
Born in Cape Town, South Africa, David Rosen was educated at Sea Point Boys High School. Early on he showed promise as an artist and won a competition to design a poster for a local suicide hotline. His winning entry was displayed as an ad on Cape Town municipal buses. After graduating in 1976, he was conscripted for two years to the South African 6th Infantry Division. After one year, he was posted to Youngsfield Anti-Aircraft Base in Cape Town where he worked on the Battalion magazine as an illustrator. In 1980-81 he was a student at the Cape Technikon School of Art. In 1982-83 he was student at the School of Contemporary Art in Cape Town.

== Life and career ==
In 1983, David Rosen formed his first fashion label called “Electric Affair” (for Momentum Clothing). He designed non-denim pants (“Parachute pants”), and sold across racial lines in a still very segregated market. He also designed his first “political” tee shirt: an anti-nuclear design highlighting the Koeberg Nuclear Power Station, not far from where he lived. In 1984, he formed his own business, teaming up with Laurie Dreyer from Chelsea West and Bad Boys Clothing. The line was called “Affair of State”.

In 1985 his “LET'S SHARE” tee shirt was banned by the apartheid government and after it appeared on the front page of The Cape Times newspaper, the security police confiscated anything with his label and the tag-line: “clothes for people by david”.

Frustrated by the politics and general creative environment, David moved to New York City. In 1986, along with partner Danny Forman (Forecaster of Boston) he formed “Affair of State NYC” designing Better Junior and Contemporary collections. From 1986 to the beginning of the 1990s David made his name in New York city, selling to major specialty and department stores like Bloomingdales, Macy's and Patricia Field.

In the early 2000s, David moved to Boston. Shortly after, in 2003, David created the Reason8 label as a fashion-driven response to the invasion of iraq and various political and ideological drifts following the presidency of George W. Bush. Reason8 shirts combined strong graphic design with thought-provoking messages on a range of political and social topics. David designed the "WMD: Weapons of Mass Deception" shirt in reaction to the controversy around Iraq's weapons of mass destruction. His "I do, I do, I do" became popularly associated with the debate on same-sex marriage. He also addressed the controversy around the increasing surveillance with the design "One Nation Under Surveillance". Other designs include the popular "got democracy?", spoof on the got milk? advertisements.

In 2008, David was diagnosed with lung cancer and struggled through therapy for some time. While in treatment at Dana–Farber Cancer Institute he began recording a visual diary of the experience including doing paint-studies of the Infusion Rooms. This became the basis for his first solo exhibition "Hotel Chemo", a collection of paintings and writings. Cancer radically changed his artistic outlook. From 2008 up to the time of his death in 2014, he only issued limited editions shirts and his main focus shifted toward process art through his painting, illustration, sculpture and multi-media projects. In particular, he focused on surrealist automatism as healing tool. In his final years, he is bent on capturing specific moments in the creation of a painting, moments when he pauses and just for that second, the painting is complete. He used resin to preserve these moments, which he called "skins".
