= David M. Rosen =

American anthropologist (born 1944)

David M. Rosen is an American anthropologist. Rosen holds a J.D. from Pace University School of Law and a Ph.D. in anthropology from the University of Illinois. He is Professor of Anthropology, at Fairleigh Dickinson University. He lived in Teaneck, New Jersey and now resides in Brooklyn.

Rosen's book, Armies of the Young: Child Soldiers in War and Terrorism, garnered considerable public attention. The book discusses three case studies: Jewish children fighting the Germans in World War II, child soldiers in Sierra Leone, and Palestinian child fighters both in the 1930s and 1940s and during the First Intifada, in the context of political theories about the ethics of children becoming soldiers.

Rosen was active in the campaign against blood diamonds.
