= David Rosen (entomologist) =

Israeli entomologist (1936–1997)

David Rosen (Hebrew: דוד רוזן; 20 April 1936 - 8 January 1997) was an Israeli entomologist known for his work on pest control. He was also a specialist on the taxonomy of the Chalcidoidea. He served as Vigevani Professor of Agriculture and Professor of Entomology at the Faculty of Agriculture of the Hebrew University of Jerusalem.

Rosen was born to Josef and Fela in Tel-Aviv where he went to high school. He later studied at the Hebrew University of Jerusalem and studied under Zvi Avidov followed by Ph.D. studies under Israel Cohen on biological control in citrus. He was awarded the Jacobson Prize for citrus research in 1965. His postdoctoral studies were with Paul DeBach at the University of California, Riverside after which he returned to Israel to work at the Hebrew University. He died of cancer in 1997.

== Publications ==
He guided numerous students, taught courses and wrote scientific papers as well as book. Some of the books include:

- Rosen, D. and DeBach, P. (1979) Species of Aphytis of the World (Hymenoptera: Aphelinidae). Israel Universities Press, Jerusalem, and W. Junk, The Hague, The Netherlands, ix+801 pp.,1342 figs.
- Rosen, D. [Editor] (1981) The Role of Hyperparasitism in Biological Control: a Symposium. University of California Division of Agricultural Sciences, Riverside, CA, Publication 4103, 52 pp.
- Rosen, D. [Editor] (1990) Armored Scale Insects: Their Biology, Natural Enemies and Control. World Crop Pests series, Volumes 4A, xvi+384 pp., and 4B, xxvi+688 pp., Elsevier Science Publishers, Amsterdam, the Netherlands.
- DeBach, P. and Rosen, D. (1991) Biological Control by Natural Enemies.2nd ed. Cambridge University Press, Cambridge, UK, xv+440 pp.
- Rosen, D., Bennett, F.D. and Capinera, J.L. [Editors] (1994) Pest Management in the Subtropics: Biological Control –a Florida Perspective. Intercept, Andover, UK, xiv+737 pp.
- Rosen, D., Bennett, F.D. and Capinera, J.L. [Editors] (1996) Pest Management in the Subtropics: IPM –a Florida Perspective. Intercept, Andover, UK.
- Rosen, D., Tel-Or, E., Hadar, Y. and Chen, Y. [Editors] Modern Agriculture and the Environment. Kluwer Press, Amsterdam, the Netherlands.
