= David Rosen (musicologist) =

- Occupation: Musicologist

David Rosen (born September 21, 1938, in San Francisco) is an expert in nineteenth- and early twentieth-century Italian opera. He is noted for having discovered the complete score of Messa per Rossini, presumed lost, in the archives of the Italian music publishing house G. Ricordi & Co in 1986.

He was responsible for the critical edition of Verdi's Messa da Requiem and the Cambridge Music Handbook on the Requiem. He also discovered in the Bibliothèque Nationale a passage in Verdi's manuscript score for Don Carlos which had had to be cut in order to ensure that the opera's premiere would finish before midnight. This led to a further discovery of more music which had also been discarded.

Rosen has also pursued an interest in understanding the original staging of late romantic opera, publishing a seminal work on the staging of Un ballo in maschera. He is an emeritus professor of musicology in the Department of Music at Cornell University. He has worked also with the Centro studi Giacomo Puccini and the Fondo Leoncavallo.
