= Nir Rosen =

American journalist and chronicler of the Iraq War

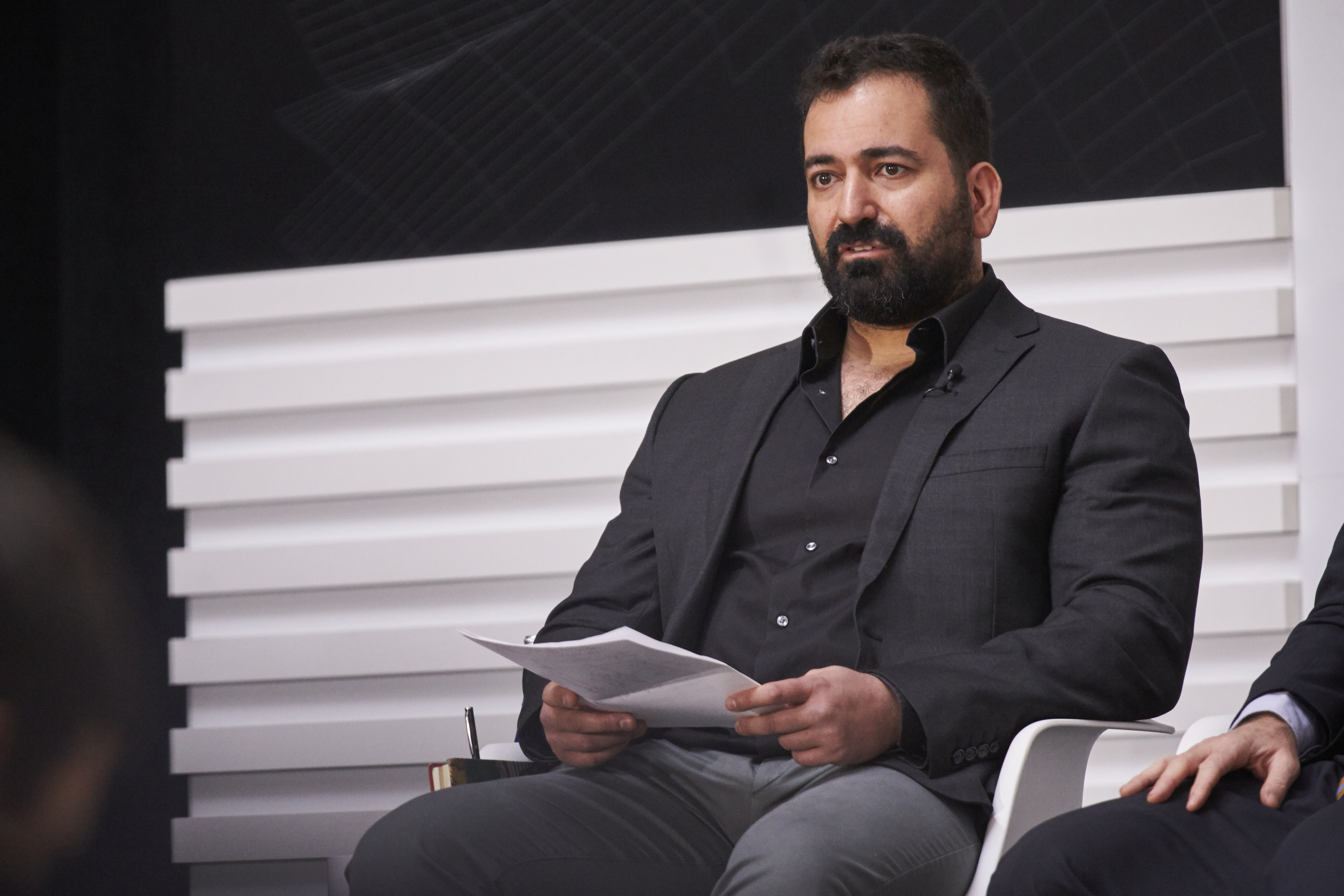
- Born: May 17, 1977; New York City
- Occupation: Journalist

Nir Rosen (born May 17, 1977, New York City) is an American journalist and chronicler of the Iraq War, who resides in Lebanon. Rosen writes on current and international affairs. In 2014 he was a special adviser for the Centre for Humanitarian Dialogue, a conflict resolution NGO.

== Career ==
Nir Rosen was born in New York City and attended the High School of Music And Art. Rosen is known for his writings on the rise of violence in Iraq following the 2003 invasion, which form the basis of his first book, In the Belly of the Green Bird (2006). He spent eight years in Iraq reporting on the Coalition occupation, the relationship between Americans and Iraqis, the development of postwar Iraqi religious and political movements, inter-ethnic and sectarian relations, and the Iraqi civil war.

He has regularly contributed to leading periodicals, such as Atlantic Monthly, The Washington Post, the New York Times Magazine, the Boston Review, and Harper's. He contributed to the footage of Iraq in Charles Ferguson's documentary No End In Sight and was also interviewed for the film. Rosen has written extensively against the surge in Iraq, notably in a March 2008 article for Rolling Stone.

From 2005 to 2008, Rosen was a fellow at the New America Foundation. In September 2007, he was the C.V. Starr Distinguished Visitor at The American Academy in Berlin. On April 2, 2008, Rosen testified before the U.S. Senate Foreign Relations Committee at their hearings on political prospects in Iraq after the surge.

In 2010, he published his second book, Aftermath. From 2008 to 2011, Rosen was a fellow at the Center on Law and Security at the New York University School of Law, until his resignation in the wake of his controversial statements about Lara Logan's sexual assault in Egypt.

In February 2011, Rosen commented to his Twitter account regarding Lara Logan, Chief Foreign Affairs Correspondent for CBS News, who was beaten and sexually assaulted in the February riots in Egypt. "Jesus Christ, at a moment when she is going to become a martyr and glorified we should at least remember her role as a major war monger," wrote Rosen. Rosen suggested that she was trying to outdo Anderson Cooper, who was attacked but not sexually assaulted just days before, and that it would have been humorous had Cooper suffered a similar assault, saying "it would have been funny if it happened to Anderson too." Rosen later posted an apology on Twitter and resigned his position as a fellow at New York University's Center on Law and Security. Rosen stated that he did not read the CBS News press release to which he had linked and that at the time of his comments he did not know Logan's assault had been sexual.

In March 2011, Mary Kaldor, Co-Director at the Center for Global Governance at the London School of Economics had hired Rosen as a research fellow to work on North Africa. This created controversy due to Kaldor's involvement in the LSE–Gaddafi affair. After two days, Rosen resigned from his position as a fellow at the London School of Economics. An LSE spokesman said, “Nir Rosen today resigned his temporary visiting fellowship at LSE—which was an unpaid position.”

== Beliefs and views ==
In April 2008, when asked by Senator Joe Biden what could be done to improve the situation in Iraq, Rosen replied: "As a journalist, I'm uncomfortable advising an imperialist power about how to be a more efficient imperialist power. I don't think we're there for the interests of the Iraqi people. I don't think that's ever been a motivation."

== Publications ==
- In the Belly of the Green Bird: The Triumph of the Martyrs in Iraq, New York: Free Press, 2006. ISBN 0-7432-7703-1
  - (as paperback) The Triumph of the Martyrs: A Reporter's Journey into Occupied Iraq, Potomac Books Inc., 2008. ISBN 1-59797-184-7
- Aftermath: Following the Bloodshed of America's Wars in the Muslim World, Nation Books, 2010. ISBN 1-56858-401-6

== Critical reception ==
- Xenakis, Nicholas J. (Summer 2006). "T for Terrorist (book reviews of Alan Moore and David Lloyd, V for Vendetta; Nir Rosen, In the Belly of the Green Bird)". The National Interest (84): 134–138.
