= Fred Rosen (author) =

American writer (1953–2020)

- Born: Frederic A. Rosen; March 28, 1953; Brooklyn, New York, United States
- Died: December 2, 2020 (aged 67); Fort Lauderdale, Florida, United States
- Occupations: True crime author, journalist
- Writing career
- Genre: Non-fiction
- Subjects: True crime, history
- Notable works: Murdering the President, Lobster Boy

Frederic A. Rosen (March 28, 1953 – December 2, 2020) was an American writer who a columnist for the Arts and Leisure Section of The New York Times and a true crime author in the United States. He was also a frequent commentator in true crime documentaries on Investigation Discovery.

== Biography ==
Rosen was born in Brooklyn, New York in 1953 and eventually settled in Florida. He died on December 2, 2020, after a debilitating stroke about a month earlier.

== Writing ==
In his new book Bat Masterson, The First Dreamer, - Oct.2019 RJ Parker Publishing, Rosen shows through his original research that the legendary American Bat Masterson, an Old West lawman and NYC newspaperman was also an illegal alien from Canada, which he covered up his whole life.

In 2016, his book Murdering the President: Alexander Graham Bell and the Race to Save James Garfield was released by Potomac Books. Rosen's other published works include Lobster Boy about the murder of Grady Stiles. Rosen gave evidence in the trial against the killer.

His two books for HarperCollins There But For the Grace: Survivors of the 20th Century's Infamous Serial Killers and When Satan Wore a Cross, were best-sellers at the Doubleday Book Club, Literary Guild, Mystery Guild, and Book-of-the-Month Club. He has written other works of historical non-fiction including Cremation in America, Contract Warriors and Gold!.

== Awards ==
He won the 2005 Library Journal Best Reference Source Award for The Historical Atlas of American Crime.
