= Fred Rosen (physician) =

American paediatrician and immunologist

Fred S. Rosen
- Born: May 25, 1930
- Died: May 21, 2005 (aged 74); Boston, MA
- Awards: E. Mead Johnson Award (1971); AAI-Steinman Award for Human Immunology Research Award (2005, first recipient)
- Scientific career
- Fields: Paediatrics; Immunology
- Workplaces: Harvard Medical School; Boston Children's Hospital

Fred Saul Rosen (May 25, 1930 – May 21, 2005) was a pediatrician and immunologist at Harvard Medical School and Boston Children's Hospital.

== Early life and career ==
Rosen was born in Newark, NJ. He received his bachelor's degree from Lafayette College and his MD from Case Western Reserve University. He moved to Boston in 1955 to begin a pathology residency at Children's where he worked with Charles Janeway and Sidney Farber. He began an immunology fellowship in 1959. He and Janeway pioneered the study of primary immunodeficiency diseases at Boston Children's Hospital.

Rosen discovered, early in his career, the cause of X-linked hyper-IgM syndrome. He also worked on X-linked agammaglobulinaemia. He published over 300 papers on his research.

Rosen was the head of the division of immunology at Boston Children's Hospital from 1968 to 1985. In 1987, he moved to the CBR Institute for Biomedical Research at Harvard University.

Rosen spoke French, Italian Spanish, German, Italian, Arabic and Russian, and traveled extensively.

Rosen died of cancer in 2005. He had no surviving family members.
