= USS Saratoga (CV-60) =

Forrestal-class aircraft carrier (1956–1994)

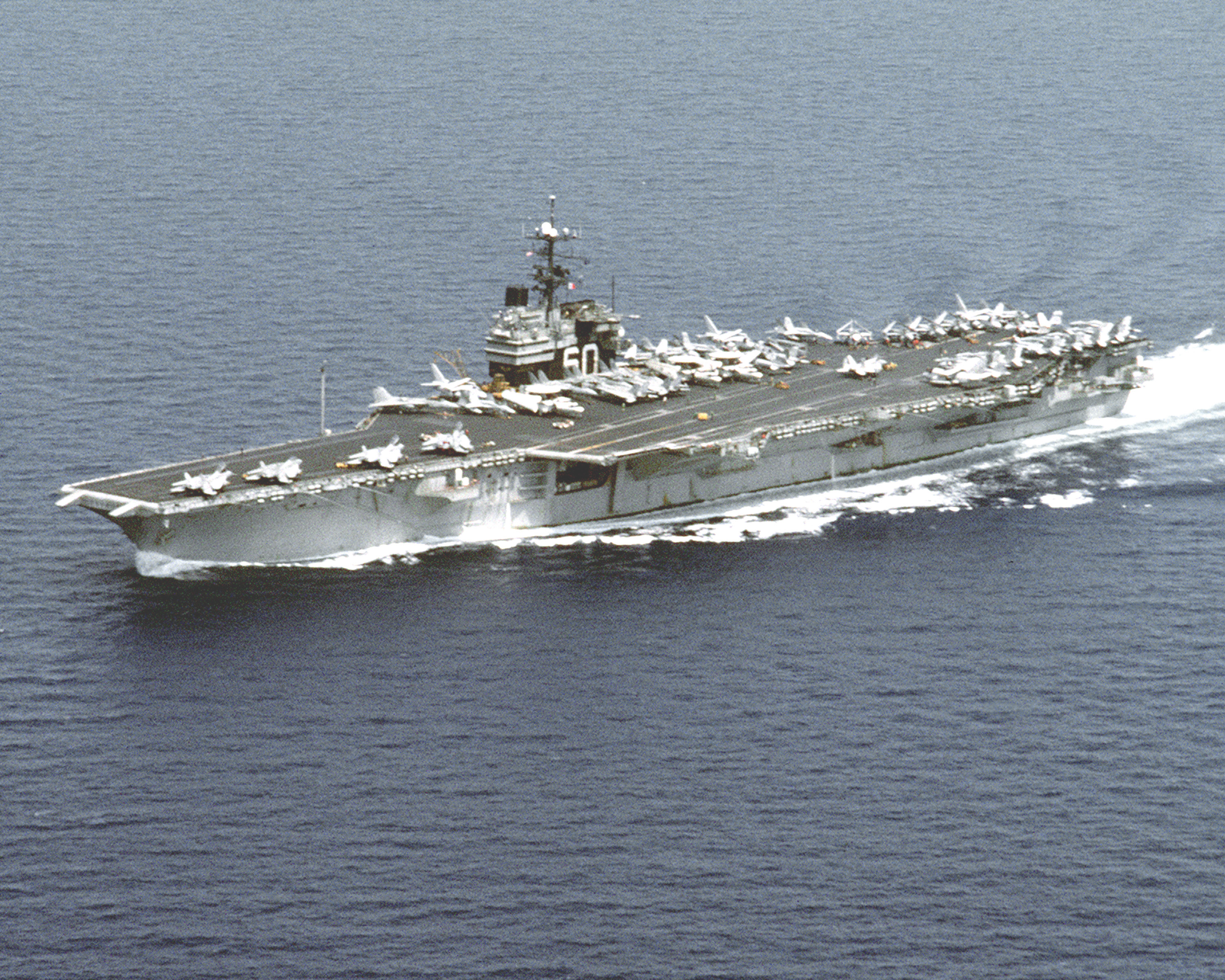
- USS Saratoga underway in 1992

History

United States
- Name: Saratoga
- Namesake: Battles of Saratoga; USS Saratoga (CV-3)
- Ordered: 23 July 1952
- Builder: New York Naval Shipyard
- Cost: $209.7 million
- Laid down: 16 December 1952
- Launched: 8 October 1955
- Acquired: 14 April 1956
- Commissioned: 14 April 1956
- Decommissioned: 20 August 1994
- Reclassified: CVA-60, 1 October 1952; CV-60, 30 June 1972
- Stricken: 20 August 1994
- Identification: Callsign: NJRS; Hull number: CVB-60
- Nickname(s): Sara
- Fate: Scrapped, 31 March 2019
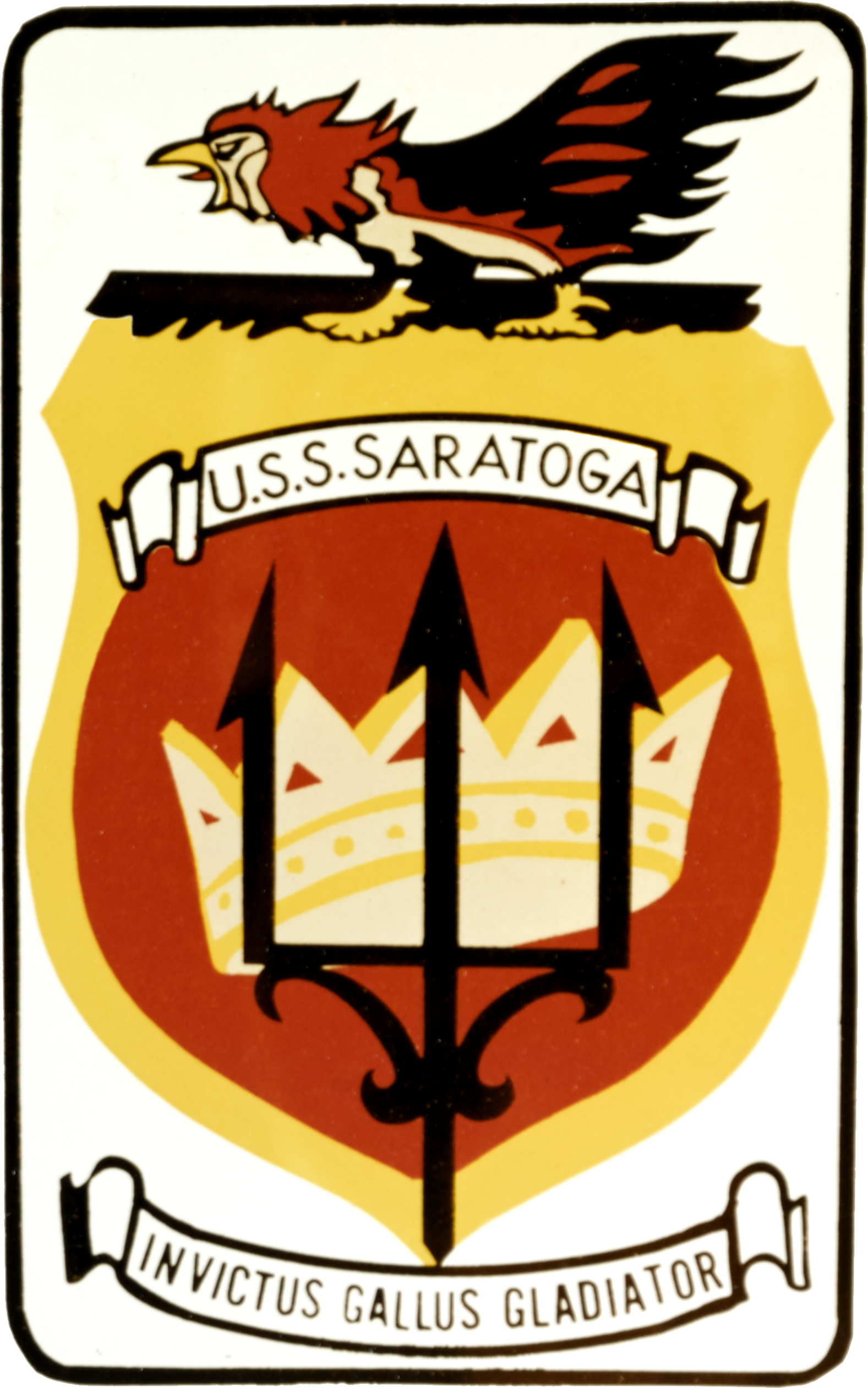
- Badge

General characteristics
- Class & type: Forrestal-class aircraft carrier
- Displacement: 81,101 long tons (82,402 t) full, 61,235 long tons (62,218 t) light, 19,866 long tons (20,185 t) dead
- Length: 1,063 ft (324 m)
- Beam: 130 ft (40 m) waterline, 252 ft (77 m) extreme
- Draft: 37 ft (11 m)
- Propulsion: 4 Westinghouse geared turbines, 4 shafts, 280,000 shp (210,000 kW); 8 Babcock & Wilcox boilers
- Speed: 35 kn (65 km/h; 40 mph)
- Complement: 552 officers, 4988 men
- Sensors & processing systems: AN/SPS-48 3D air search radar; AN/SPS-48 2D air search radar; AN/SPS-10 surface search radar
- Electronic warfare & decoys: Mark 36 SRBOC
- Armament: 8 × 5"/54 caliber Mark 42 guns (127 mm) (removed); NATO Sea Sparrow; Phalanx CIWS
- Armor: Belt: 6 in (152 mm); Flight deck: 3 in (76 mm); Torpedo Bulkheads: 3 in (76 mm)
- Aircraft carried: 70–90

USS Saratoga (CV/CVA/CVB-60) was the second of four Forrestal-class supercarriers built for the United States Navy in the 1950s. Saratoga was the sixth U.S. Navy ship, and the second aircraft carrier, to be named after the Battles of Saratoga in the American Revolutionary War.

Commissioned in 1956, she spent most of her career in the Mediterranean, but also participated during the Vietnam War, receiving one battle star for her service. One of her last operational duties was to participate in Operation Desert Storm.

Saratoga was decommissioned in 1994, and was stored at Naval Station Newport in Newport, Rhode Island. Multiple unsuccessful attempts were made to preserve her as a museum ship. The Navy paid ESCO Marine of Brownsville, Texas, one cent to take the ship for dismantling and recycling. On 15 September 2014, ex-Saratoga arrived in Brownsville, Texas, to be scrapped. Scrapping was completed by early 2019.

== Construction and trials ==
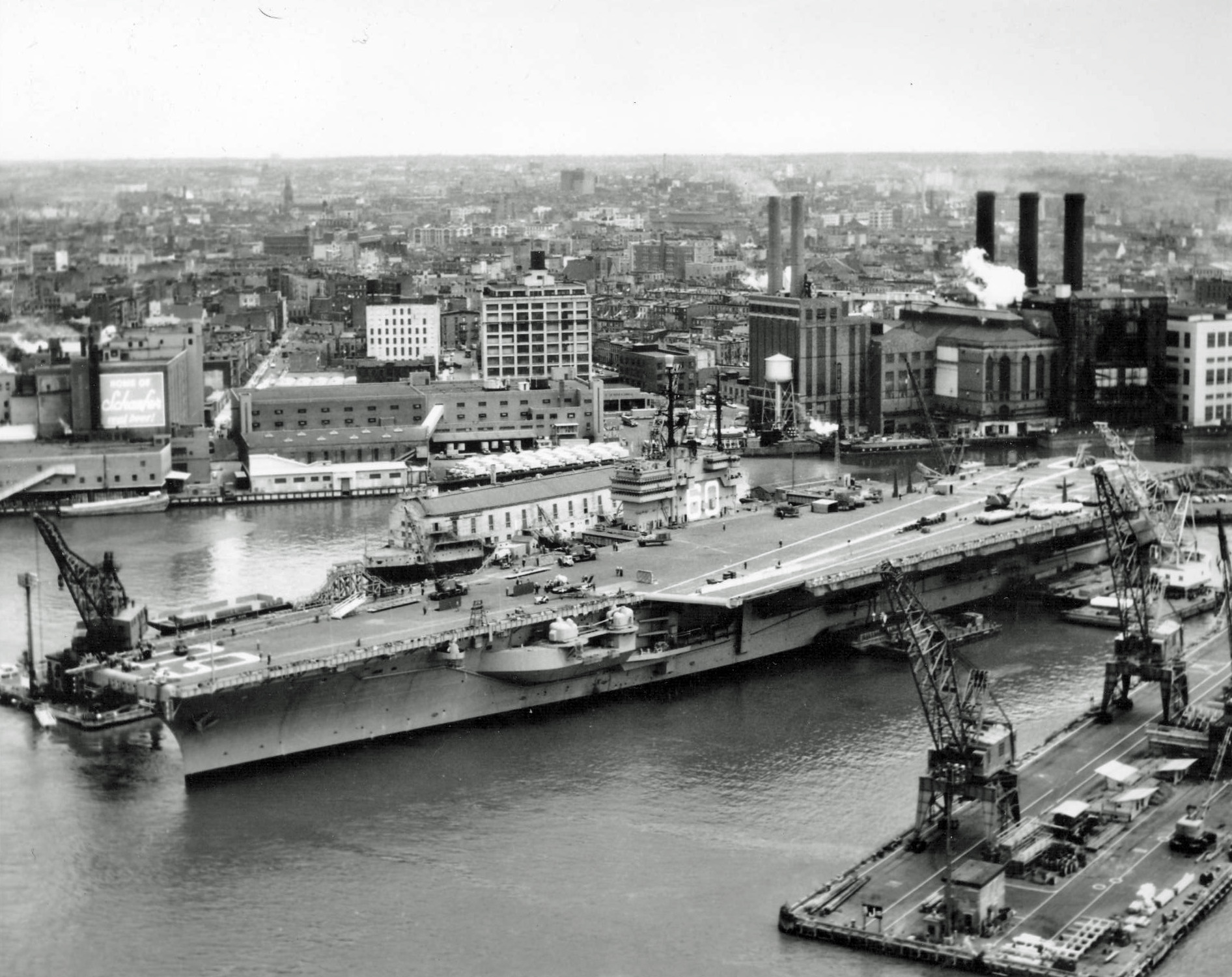
Saratoga in the Brooklyn Navy Yard in May 1956, one month after her commissioning

She was ordered as a "Large Aircraft Carrier", hull classification symbol CVB-60, and her contract was awarded to the New York Naval Shipyard of Brooklyn, New York on 23 July 1952. She is the second of the four Forrestal-class carriers. She was reclassified as an "Attack Aircraft Carrier" (CVA-60) on 1 October 1952. Her keel was laid down on 16 December 1952. She was launched on 8 October 1955 sponsored by Mrs. Charles S. Thomas, and commissioned on 14 April 1956 with CAPT Robert Joseph Stroh in command. She was the first carrier in the US Navy to use high-pressure 1,200 psi (8,300 kPa) boilers.

== Service history ==
=== 1950s ===
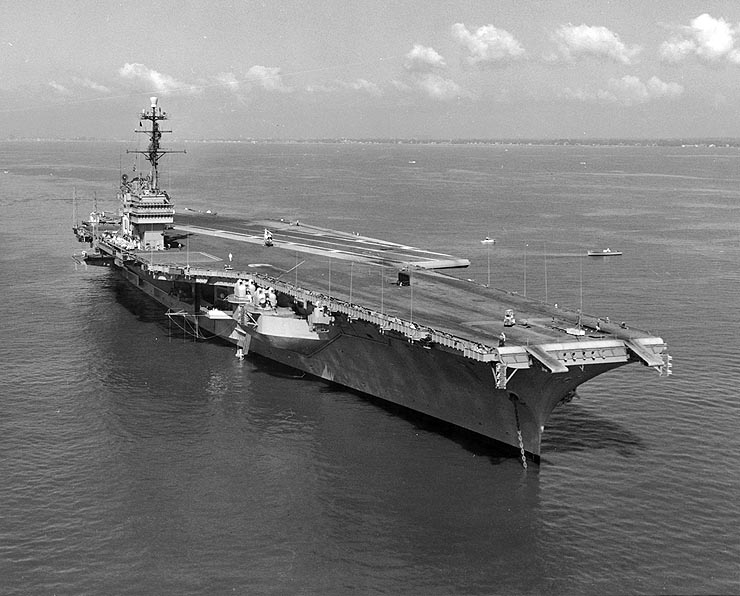
Saratoga in Hampton Roads, Virginia, during the International Naval Review, 1957

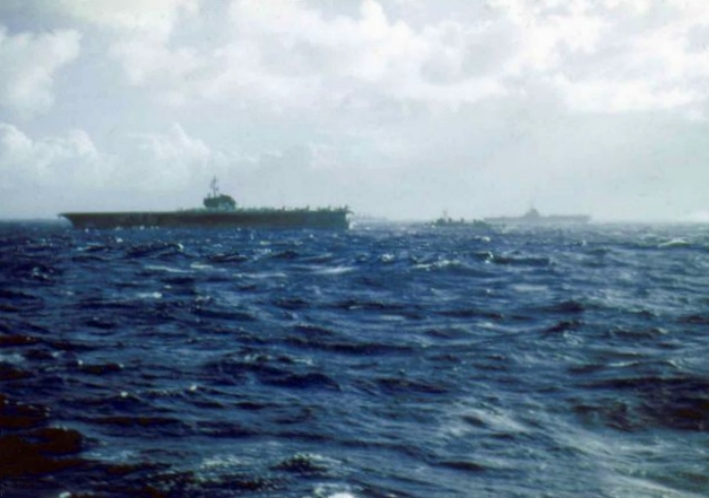
Saratoga during NATO Operation Strikeback (1957)

For the next several months, Saratoga conducted various engineering, flight, steering, structural, and gunnery tests. On 18 August, she sailed for Guantanamo Bay and her shakedown cruise. On 19 December, she reentered the New York Naval Shipyard and remained there until 28 February 1957. Upon completion of yard work, she got underway on a refresher training cruise to the Caribbean before entering her home port, Naval Station Mayport in Mayport, Florida.

Contemporary 1957 Navy film of the USS Saratoga

On 6 June 1957, President of the United States Dwight D. Eisenhower and members of his cabinet boarded Saratoga to observe operations on board the giant carrier. For two days, she and eighteen other ships demonstrated air operations, antisubmarine warfare, guided missile operations, and the Navy's latest bombing and strafing techniques. Highlighting the President's visit was the nonstop flight of two F8U Crusaders, spanning the nation in three hours and twenty-eight minutes, from Bon Homme Richard off the West Coast to the flight deck of Saratoga in the Atlantic.

Also in 1957, Saratoga conducted Regulus guided missile tests. She was one of ten aircraft carriers configured to operate the turbojet powered subsonic guided missile and only one of six carriers to ever actually launch the missile (performing two test launches) providing the first United States Navy nuclear strategic deterrence force.

The carrier departed Mayport on 3 September 1957 for her maiden transatlantic voyage. Saratoga sailed into the Norwegian Sea and participated in Operation Strikeback, joint naval maneuvers of the North Atlantic Treaty Organization (NATO) countries. She returned briefly to Mayport before entering the Norfolk Naval Shipyard for repairs.

On 1 February 1958, Saratoga departed Mayport for the Mediterranean and her first deployment with the Sixth Fleet. From this date through 31 December 1967 she was to spend a part of each year in the Mediterranean on a total of eight cruises. The remainder of the time, she either operated off the coast of Florida or was in port undergoing restricted availability.

=== 1960s ===
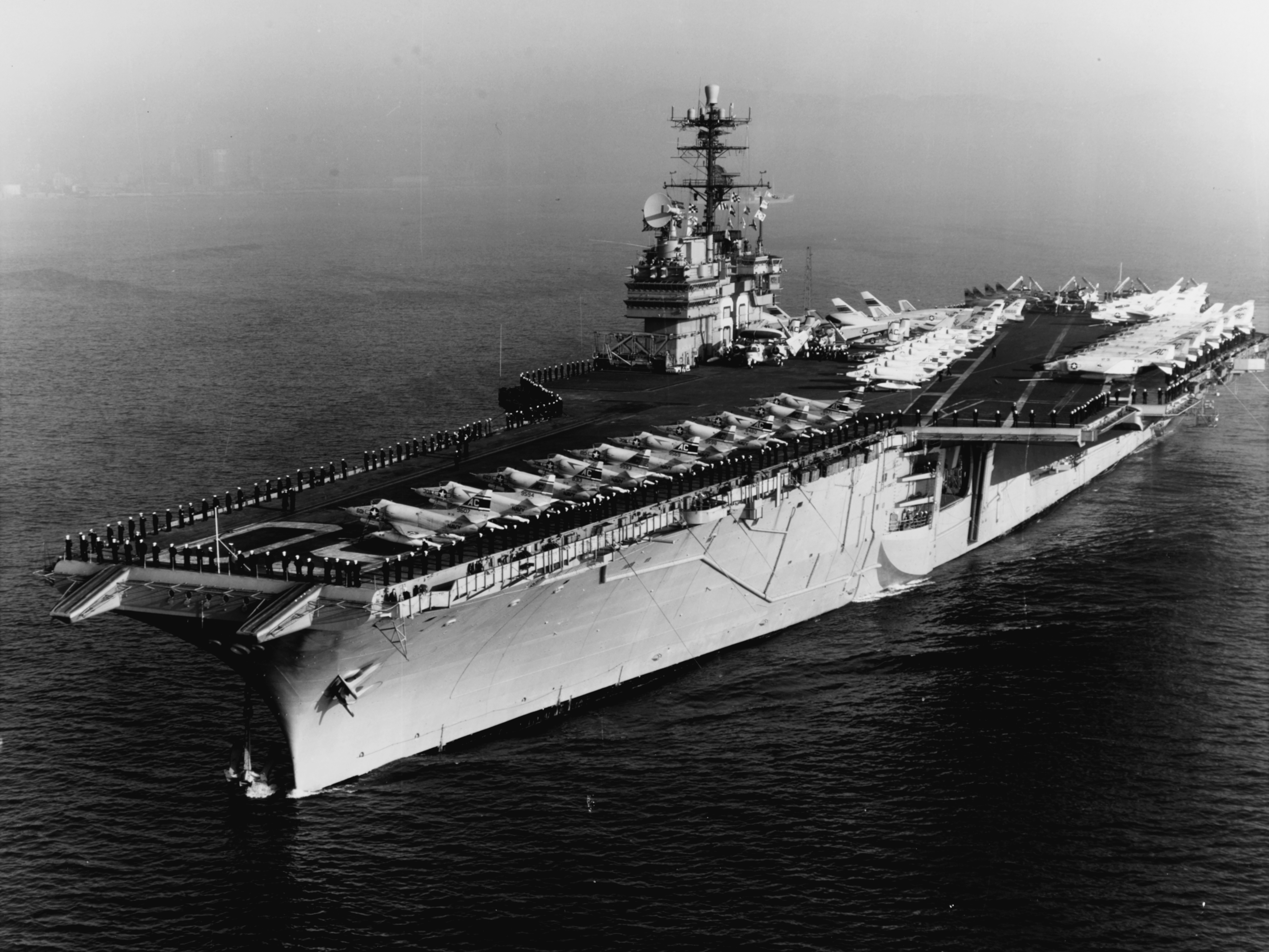
Saratoga entering harbor at Barcelona, Spain, 1965

On the night of 24–25 May 1960, Saratoga collided with the German freighter Bernd Leonhardt off North Carolina. The freighter's bridge and superstructure were damaged by the carrier's flight-deck. The results of an investigation were never published, but repairs to the freighter, amounting to about 2.5 million German marks, were paid for by the U.S. Navy.

While deployed with the Sixth Fleet on 23 January 1961, a serious fire broke out in Saratoga's number two machinery space which took seven lives. The fire, believed caused by a ruptured fuel oil line, was brought under control by the crew, and the ship proceeded to Athens, Greece, where a survey of the damage could be made. The ship continued on its patrol mission with reduced steam generation capability, returning to the U.S. as scheduled to offload its air group before going to repair.

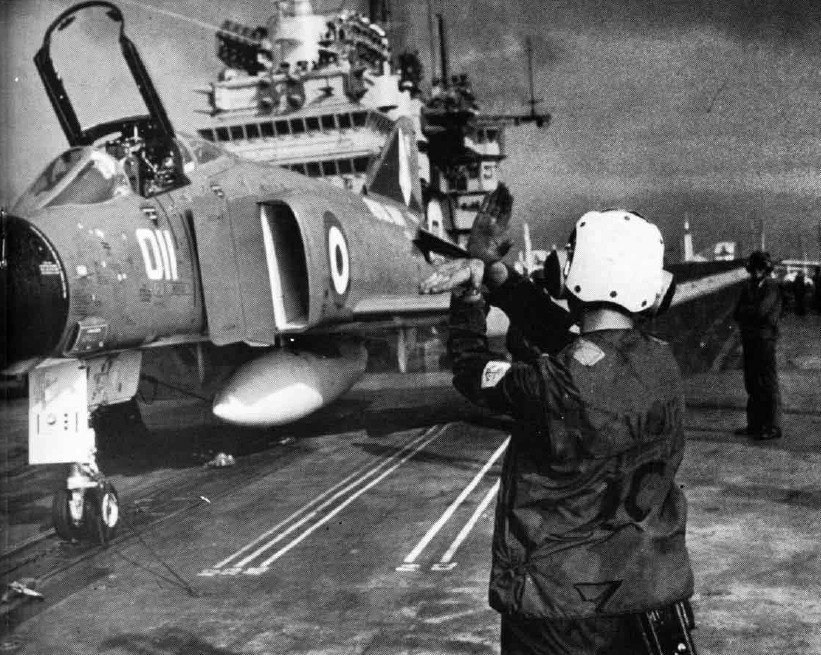
An F-4K Phantom of 892 NAS is lined up on the catapult aboard Saratoga in 1969; 892 NAS was deployed to Saratoga to work up prior to the recommissioning of HMS Ark Royal, from which the unit would eventually operate.

After an extensive shipyard period in the second half of 1964, Saratoga departed for the Mediterranean, arriving just before Christmas 1964. Ports visited over the next 6 months were Naples, Athens, Cannes, Valencia, Istanbul, and Malta. Another routine Med cruise was undertaken in 1966. The Med cruise from June to December 1967 was anything but routine. Immediately after entering the Med, Saratoga was deployed to the eastern Mediterranean during the 1967 Arab-Israeli war, where her medical facility was used to treat survivors of the Israeli attack on USS Liberty. Later on she was involved in a near collision with the cruiser Little Rock, which cut across Saratoga's bow during flight operations. Saratoga had messaged indicating that she was planning to turn to starboard. This would put Little Rock on the outside of the turn because Little Rock was on the port side. As the carrier indicated she was executing her turn, Little Rock increased speed to maintain position. Unfortunately, Saratoga turned to port, putting Little Rock across her bow. Fortunately there was little damage and no injuries reported.

In January 1966 planes from the Saratoga rescued 5 survivors of Haitian Air Force DC-3 crash that killed four member of the United Nations mission to Haiti.

During the return voyage in early December 1967, Saratoga spent several days in a fierce Atlantic storm, which caused heavy damage to external catwalks on the flight deck, garbage chute, and boat sponsons. She arrived in Mayport on 6 December.

On 2 January 1968, Saratoga sailed for the Philadelphia Naval Shipyard, and an overhaul and modernization program which was to last 11 months. On 31 January 1969, she departed Philadelphia for Guantanamo, via Hampton Roads and Mayport, and extensive refresher training of the crew and air detachments.

On 17 May 1969, Armed Forces Day, she was the host ship for President Richard Nixon during the firepower demonstration conducted by Carrier Air Wing Three in the Virginia Capes area. On 9 July, she departed Mayport for her ninth Mediterranean deployment. Underway, a Soviet surface force and a November-class submarine passed in close proximity, en route to Cuba. Off the Azores on 17 July, Saratoga was shadowed by Kipelovo-based Soviet aircraft. They were intercepted, photographed, and escorted while in the vicinity of the carrier. She operated with Task Group 60.2 of the Sixth Fleet in the eastern Mediterranean during September in a "show of force" in response to the large build-up of Soviet surface units there, the hijacking of a Trans World Airlines plane to Syria and the political coup in Libya. Numerous surveillance and reconnaissance flights were conducted by Carrier Wing Three aircraft against Soviet surface units, including the helicopter carrier Soviet helicopter carrier Moskva, operating southeast of Crete. Saratoga operated in this area again in October because of the crisis in Lebanon.

=== 1970s ===
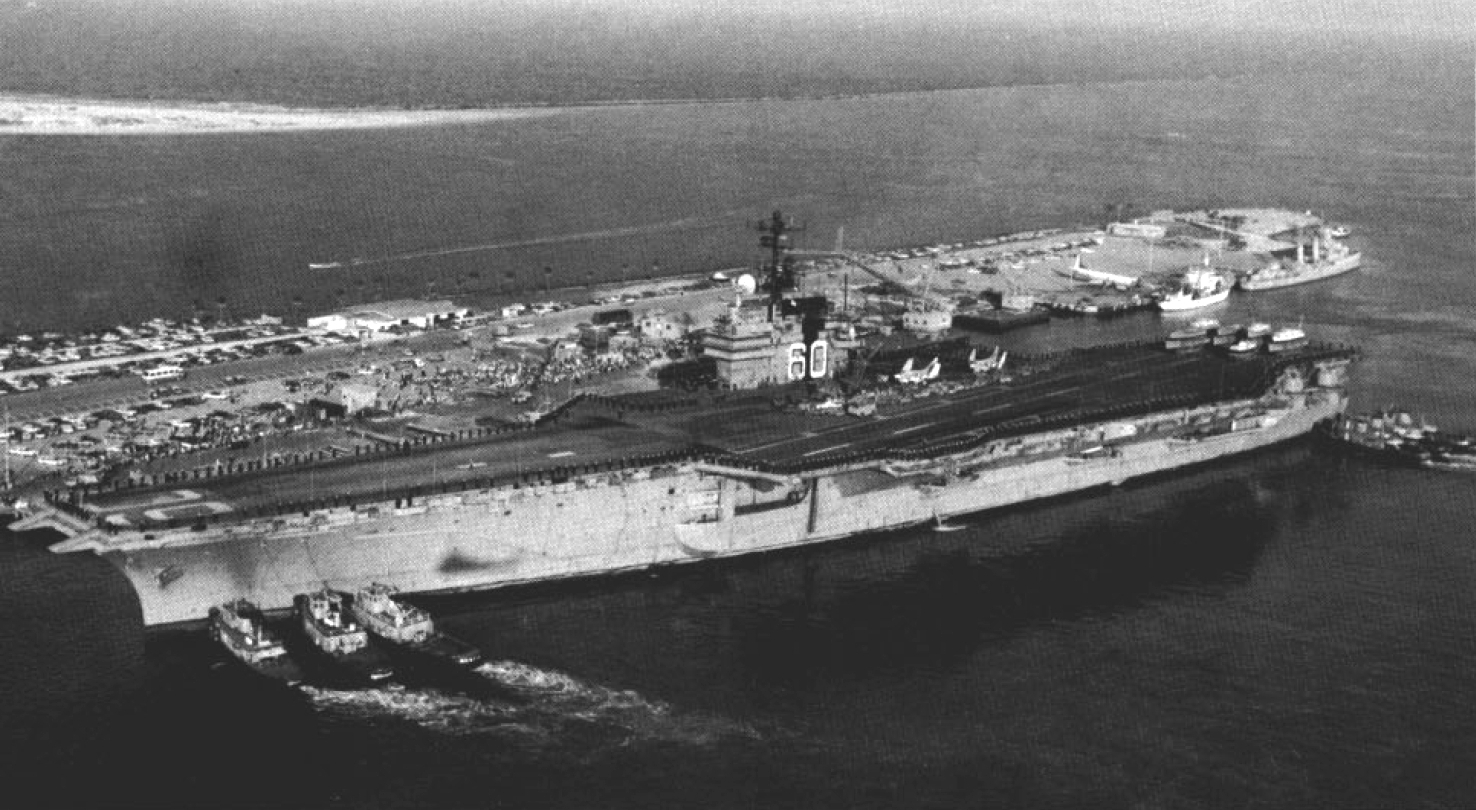
Saratoga comes alongside at Mayport in 1971.

Saratoga returned to Mayport and the Florida coast from 22 January until 11 June 1970 when she again sailed for duty with the Sixth Fleet.

On 28 September 1970, President Richard Nixon and his party arrived on board. That night, word was received that Gamal Abdel Nasser, President of the United Arab Republic had died; an event that might plunge the entire Middle East into a crisis. The intelligence and communications personnel of the Saratoga were required to supply the President, Joint Chiefs of Staff, and the Secretaries of State and Defense with the essential intelligence information to keep them abreast of the deteriorating situation. The presidential party departed the ship the next evening, and Saratoga continued on patrol in the eastern Mediterranean until she sailed for the United States on 2 November.

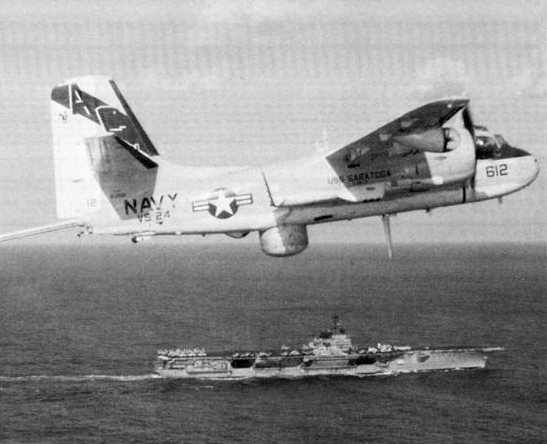
An S-2G Tracker of VS-24 overflies Saratoga during her 1974–75 Mediterranean cruise.

From her arrival at Mayport until 10 March 1971, she was in a "cold iron" status. She then operated off the Florida coast until 7 June when she departed for her eleventh deployment with the Sixth Fleet, via Scotland and the North Sea where she participated in exercise "Magic Sword II." She returned to Mayport on 31 October for a period of restricted availability and local operations.

=== Vietnam War ===
On 11 April 1972, Saratoga sailed from Mayport en route to Subic Bay, and her first deployment to the Western Pacific. She arrived in Subic Bay on 8 May and departed for Vietnam the following week, arriving at "Yankee Station" on 18 May for her first period on the line. Before year's end, she was on station in the Tonkin Gulf a total of seven times: 18 May to 21 June; 1 to 16 July; 28 July to 22 August; 2 to 19 September; 29 September to 21 October; 5 November to 8 December; and 18 to 31 December. She had been reclassified as a "Multi-purpose Aircraft Carrier" (CV-60) on 30 June 1972.

During the first period, Saratoga lost four aircraft and three pilots. On 21 June, two of her F-4 Phantoms attacked three Mikoyan-Gurevich MiG-21s over North Vietnam. Dodging four surface-to-air missiles, they managed to down one of the MiG aircraft. Saratoga's planes attacked targets ranging from enemy troop concentrations in the lower panhandle to petroleum storage areas northeast of Hanoi. On her second line period, she lost an F-4 to enemy fire northeast of Hanoi with the pilot and radar intercept officer missing in action. During this period, her aircraft flew 708 sorties against the enemy.

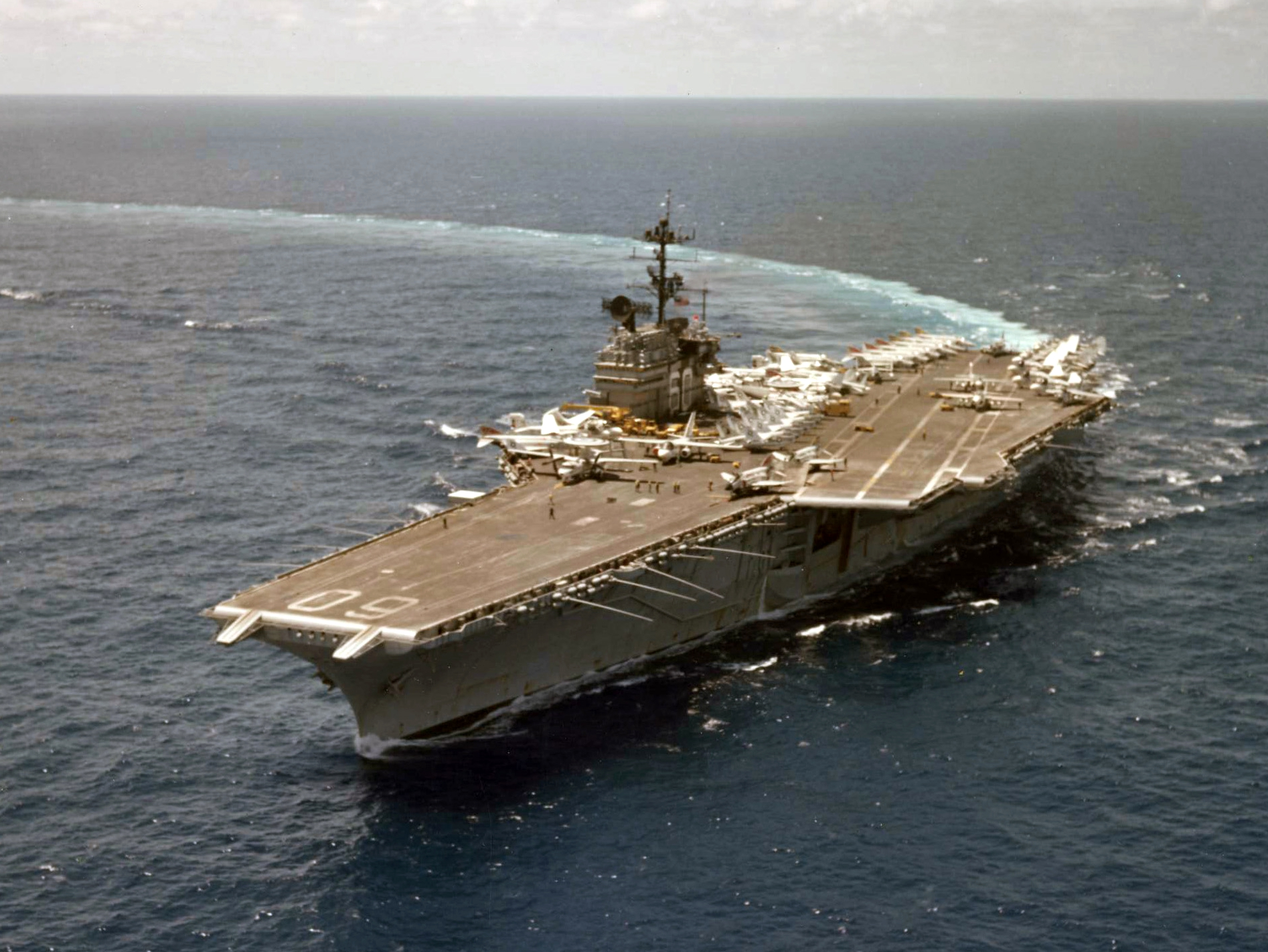
Saratoga underway in the Atlantic in 1975

On 6 August, LT Jim Lloyd of Attack Squadron VA-105, flying an A-7 Corsair on a bombing mission near Vinh, had his plane shot out from under him by a SAM. He ejected into enemy territory at night. In a daring rescue by helicopters supported by CVW-3 aircraft, he was lifted from the midst of enemy soldiers and returned to the Saratoga. On 10 August, one of the ship's CAP jet fighters splashed a MiG at night using AIM-7 Sparrow missiles.

During the period 2 to 19 September, Saratoga's aircraft flew over 800 combat strike missions against targets in North Vietnam. On 20 October, her aircraft flew 83 close air support sorties in six hours in support of a force of 250 Territorials beleaguered by the North Vietnamese 48th Regiment. Air support saved the small force, enabled ARVN troops to advance, and killed 102 North Vietnamese soldiers. During her last period on station, Saratoga's aircraft battered targets in the heart of North Vietnam for over a week.

Saratoga departed "Yankee Station" for Subic Bay on 7 January 1973. From there she sailed for the United States via Singapore and arrived at Mayport on 13 February 1973 where she joined the Atlantic Fleet.

=== Return to Atlantic Fleet ===
In the beginning of 1975, Saratoga took part in the Locked Gate-75, a NATO operation meant to contain the influence of the Portuguese Communist Party in Portugal after the Carnation Revolution. Along with several foreign vessels, she entered the Tagus River delta and anchored in front of the Presidential Palace of Belém.

Saratoga sailed from Mayport, Florida January 1976 for another Med cruise. On board her was VS-22 with the first deployment of the S-3A Viking anti-submarine aircraft. She also took part in operations during the Lebanon crisis in 1976.

On 3 October 1978, the Saratoga departed on another Mediterranean deployment returning on 5 April 1979. On 21 November 1978, Saratoga collided with the replenishment oiler Waccamaw while operating with the Sixth Fleet, during a refueling operation 50 miles (80 km) south of Crete, suffering minor damage and no injuries.

=== 1980s ===
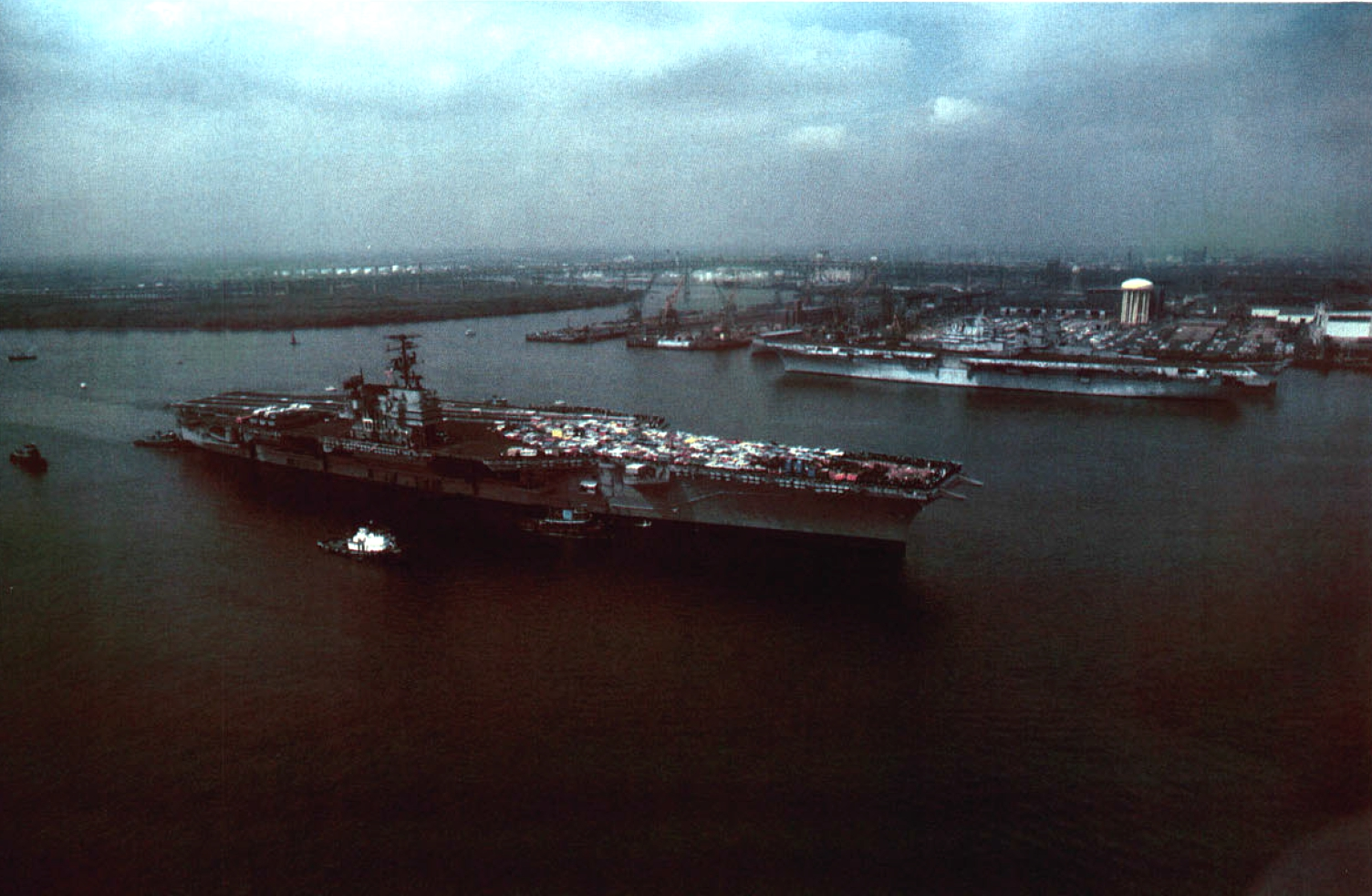
Saratoga arrives in Philadelphia prior to her 28-month SLEP overhaul; the decommissioned Essex-class aircraft carrier Shangri-La is docked behind.

In March 1980, Saratoga embarked airwing CVW-3 and departed on their 16th Mediterranean deployment. Highlights of the deployment included major exercises with the USS Forrestal battle group, and visits by the Chief of Naval Operations, ADM Thomas B. Hayward, and Master Chief Petty Officer of the Navy Thomas C. Crow. Then-commanding officer, CAPT James H. Flatley III, made naval aviation history on 21 June 1980 when he completed his 1,500th carrier arrested landing. To make the event special, Midshipman James H. Flatley IV, the Captain's son, rode in the back seat.

On 28 September 1980, only one month after her return from deployment, Saratoga departed Mayport and headed north to the Philadelphia Naval Shipyard where she underwent the most extensive industrial overhaul ever performed on any Navy ship. Saratoga was the first ship to go through the Service Life Extension Program (SLEP) overhaul that would last 28 months. She conducted sea trials on 16 October 1982, and left Philadelphia with much fanfare on 2 February 1983 with her new nickname — "Super Sara."

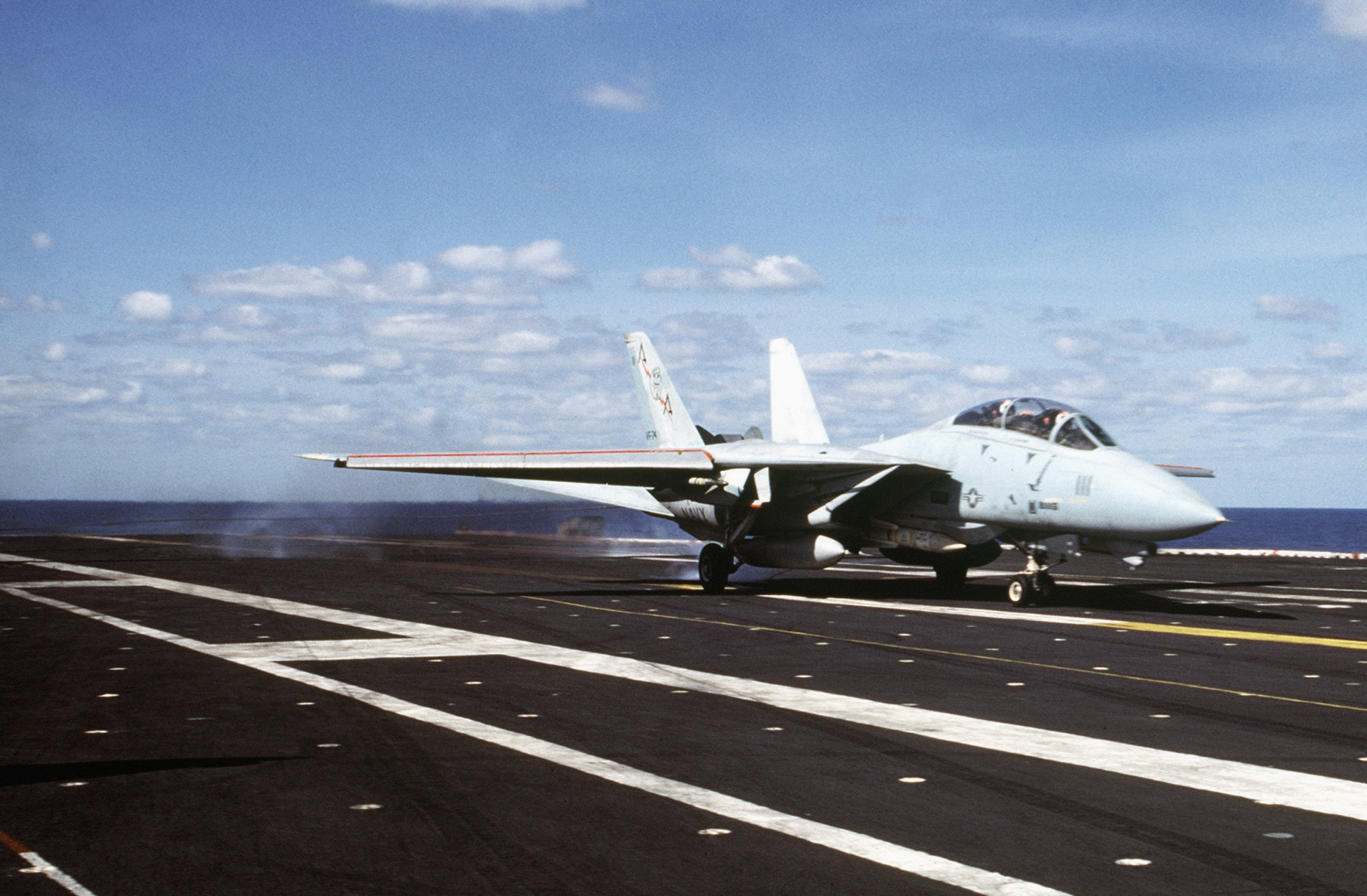
An F-14A of Fighter Squadron VF-74 catches the wire aboard Saratoga during the ship's 1985–86 Mediterranean cruise.

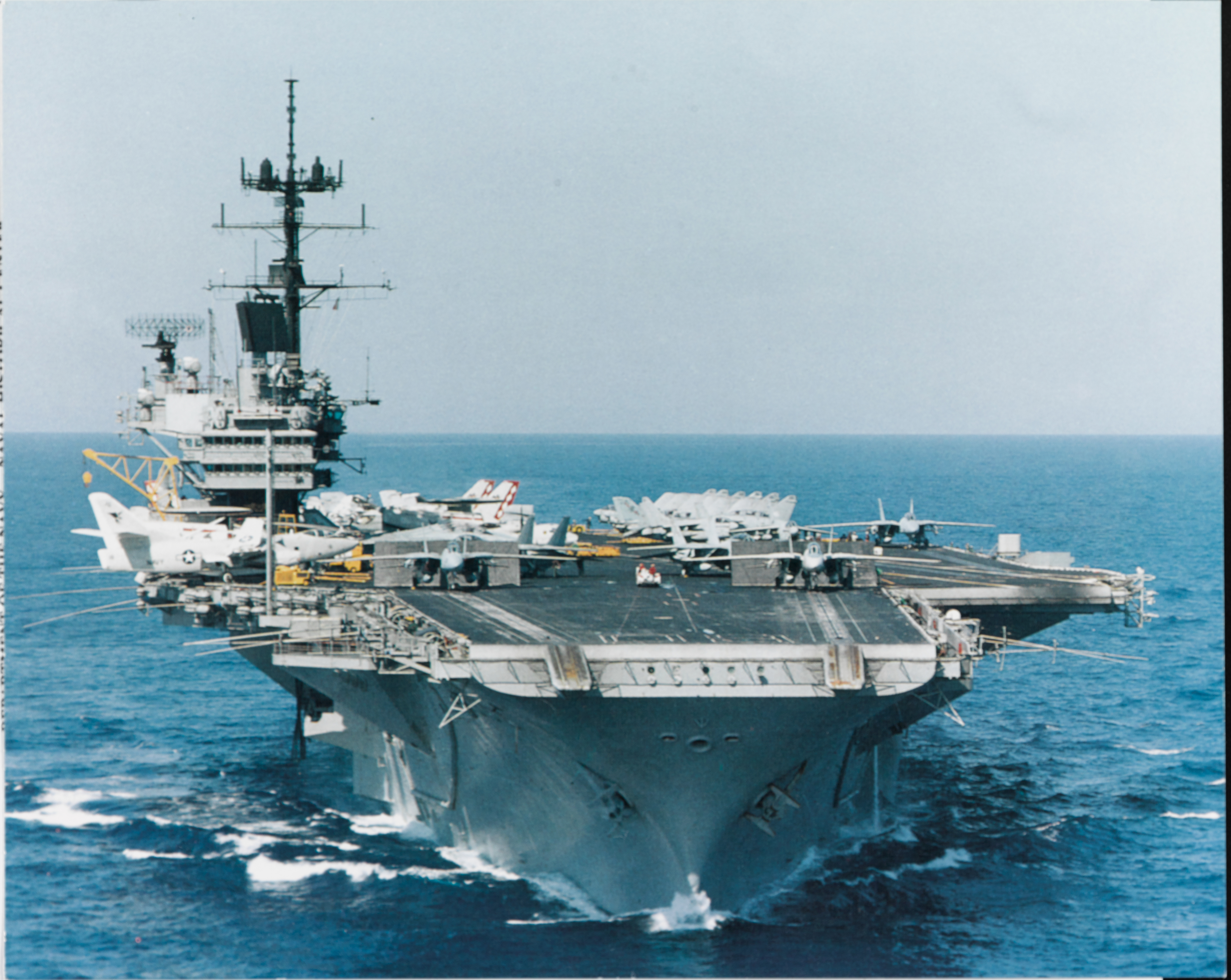
Saratoga underway in the Mediterranean in 1985. Three F-14 Tomcats are lined up on the catapults, ready to launch.

The Saratoga departed the Mayport Basin yet again for her 17th Mediterranean deployment on 2 April 1984.

Saratoga's 18th deployment was anything but ordinary. After departing Mayport in August 1985, Saratoga steamed toward the Mediterranean for what was scheduled to be a routine deployment. But on 10 October, she was called into action. An Italian luxury liner, Achille Lauro, on a pleasure cruise departing from Alexandria, was hijacked by terrorists from the Palestinian Liberation Front (PLF). After tense negotiations and the killing of an American tourist, the hijackers went ashore at Port Said. Egyptian authorities made hasty arrangements for the terrorists to depart the country. They boarded an Egypt Air 737 jetliner at the Al Maza Air Base, northeast of Cairo. On orders from President Ronald Reagan, seven F-14 Tomcats from the VF-74 "Bedevilers" and the VF-103 "Sluggers" were launched from the Saratoga. Supporting the Tomcats continuously were VA-85 Grumman KA-6D air tankers and E-2C Hawkeye of VAW-125. Off the coast of Crete, the F-14s, without the use of running lights, eased up beside and behind the airliner. On command, the Tomcats turned on their lights and dipped their wings – an international signal for a forced landing. The E-2C Hawkeye radioed the airliner to follow the F-14s. Realizing they were in a "no-win" situation, the hijackers allowed the pilot to follow the Tomcats to Naval Air Station Sigonella, Italy. One hour and 15 minutes later, the aircraft landed and the hijackers were arrested by the Italians after a disagreement between American and Italian authorities. Seven hours after the fighter jets were scrambled, all Saratoga aircraft returned home without a shot fired.

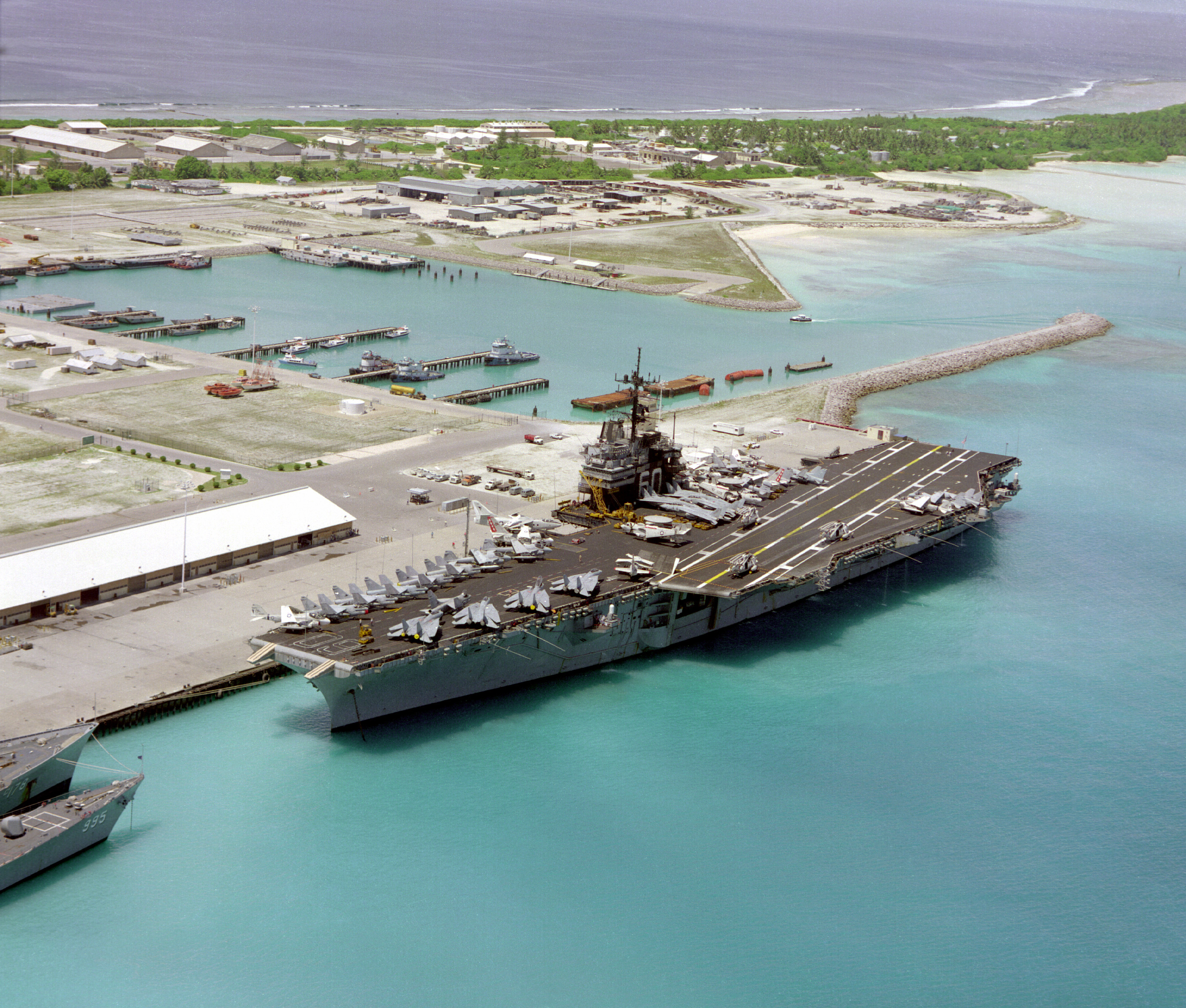
Saratoga docked at Diego Garcia, the first aircraft carrier to dock pierside

On 5 December 1985 Saratoga became the first aircraft carrier to dock pierside on the island of Diego Garcia in the Indian Ocean.

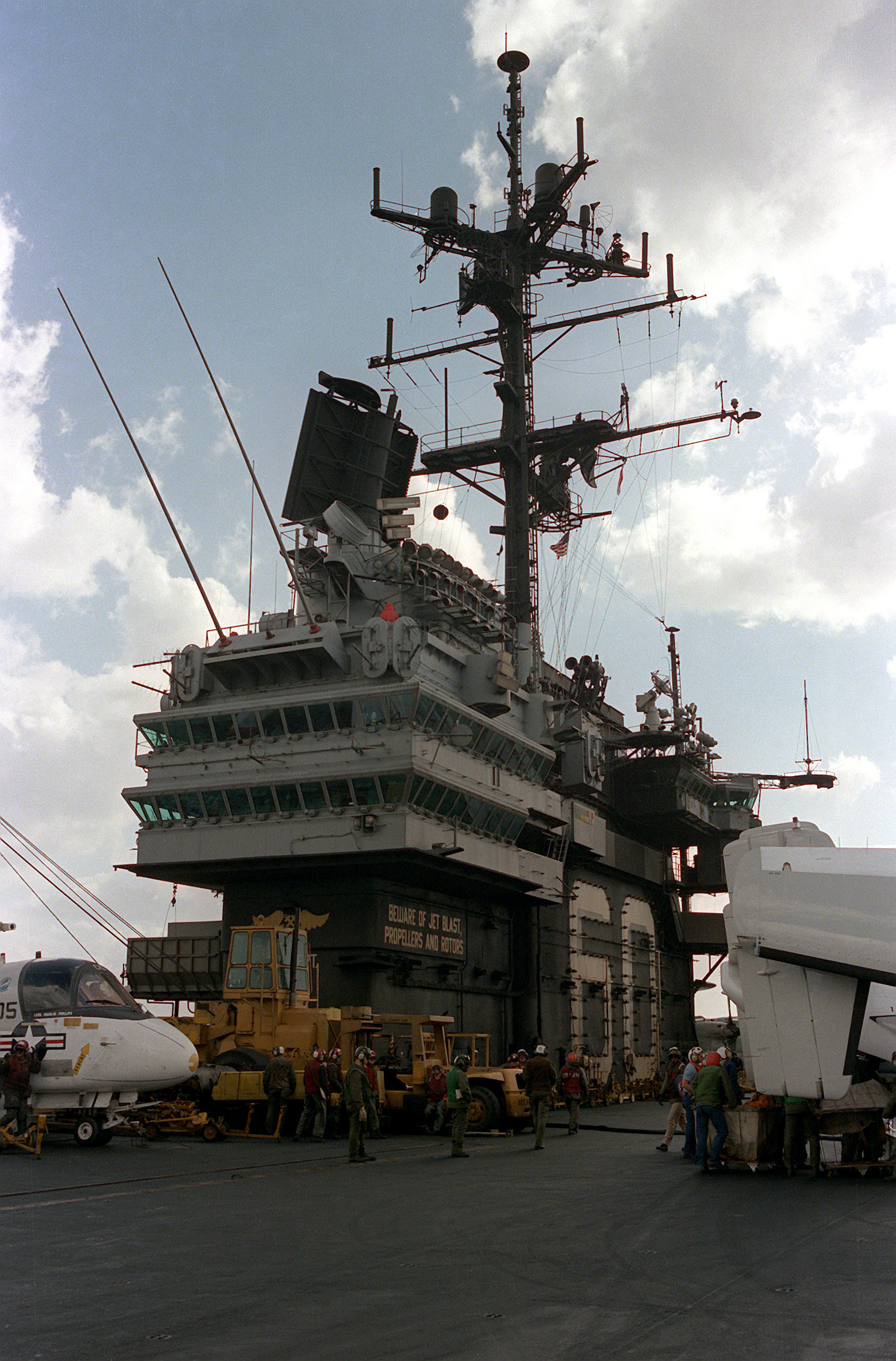
The island of Saratoga

On 23 March 1986, while operating off coast of Libya, aircraft from the carriers Saratoga, Coral Sea and America crossed what Libyan leader Muammar al-Gaddafi had called the "Line of Death." The very next day at noon, three U.S. Navy warships crossed the same 32° 30' navigational line. Two hours later, Libyan forces fired SA-5 Gammon surface-to-air missiles from the coastal town of Surt. The missiles missed their F-14 Tomcat targets and fell harmlessly into the water. Later that afternoon, U.S. aircraft turned back two Libyan Mikoyan-Gurevich MiG-25 fighter planes over the disputed Gulf of Sidra. Soon after, aircraft from the three carriers fought back in defense. A heavily armed A-6E Intruder fired Rockeye cluster bombs and a Harpoon anti-ship cruise missile at a Libyan missile patrol boat operating on the "Line of Death." Later that night, two A-7E Corsair II jets attacked a key radar installation at Surt. At the conclusion, three Libyan patrol boats and a radar site were destroyed by Navy aircraft.

==== Friendly fire shoot-down incident ====
At 1550 EDT on 22 September 1987, an F-14 Tomcat, (Note: F-14A-140-GR Tomcat, BuNo 162707) of VF-74 out of Naval Air Station Oceana, Virginia Beach, Virginia, operating from Saratoga, accidentally shot down a United States Air Force RF-4C Phantom II, (Note: RF-4C-22-MC Phantom II, 69-0381, 'ZR' tailcode) of the 26th Tactical Reconnaissance Wing, out of Zweibrücken Air Base, West Germany, over the Mediterranean during a NATO exercise, "Display Determination 87". Both RF-4C crew ejected and were rescued by a helicopter from the Saratoga within 30 minutes, suffering numerous injuries. The Tomcat pilot, Timothy W. Dorsey, was duly disciplined and permanently removed from flying status, but was recommended for promotion to rear admiral 25 years later. Dorsey also served for years as USA Discounters' general counsel and vice president, and has been the Virginia-based company's public voice as it came under fire for its frequent targeting of service members in wage-garnishment lawsuits.

Following Saratoga's 19th Mediterranean deployment in June 1987, she was overhauled once again at Norfolk Naval Shipyard, Portsmouth, Virginia, at a cost of $280 million.

=== 1990s ===
==== Operation Desert Storm ====
Saratoga along with embarked airwing CVW-17, participated in Operation Desert Storm, primarily in the Red Sea. Before the outbreak of hostilities in Iraq, Saratoga suffered a loss of 21 crewmembers in a ferry boat accident off the coast of Haifa, Israel. During the war, Saratoga set what were at the time, several records. She completed six transits of the Suez Canal and completed approximately 11,000 aircraft launch and recovery cycles. Saddam Hussein claimed on Iraqi television that Saratoga had been sunk, along with several other Coalition vessels. On one occasion during the war, a missile, possibly a Scud, was launched in the general direction of Saratoga in the Red Sea, but it was either unguided, or launched on a hunch, as it was determined early in its flight path it would miss by more than 100 nautical miles (200 km).

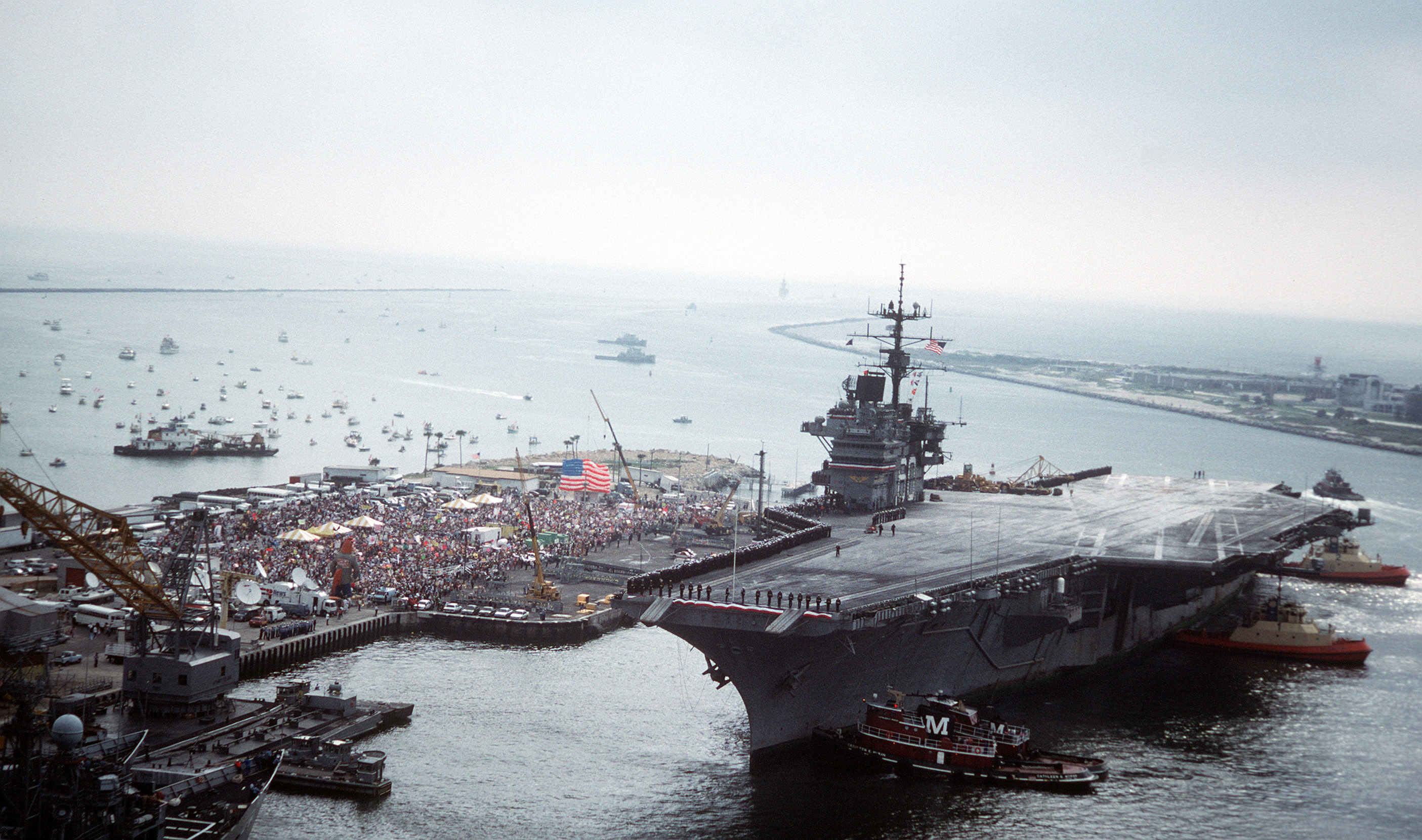
Saratoga returns from Desert Storm.

The ship launched many flights in support of operations, including that of Scott Speicher, correctly assumed to be the first American casualty of the war.

Another Saratoga aircraft shot down was an A-6E Intruder. Bombardier/Navigator LT Jeffrey Zaun was paraded before cameras by his Iraqi captors, but was eventually returned to American forces and was able to return to the Saratoga.

Saratoga-based US Navy SEALs conducted the first wartime boardings of merchant shipping in the Red Sea in support of Operation Desert Shield.

==== The TCG Muavenet incident ====
During the fall of 1992, the United States, Turkey, and several other NATO members participated in "Exercise Display Determination 1992", a combined forces naval exercise under the overall command of ADM Jeremy Michael Boorda of the United States Navy. The forces of participating nations were assigned to either of two multinational teams. VADM T. Joseph Lopez of the United States Navy led the "Brown Forces", which included Saratoga, with Commander Cruiser-Destroyer Group 8 embarked. The opposing "Green Forces", including the Turkish destroyer minelayer TCG Muavenet, former USS Gwin (DM-33), were under the direct control of Admiral Kroon of the Netherlands.

During the "enhanced tactical" phase of the training exercises, the Brown Forces were to attempt an amphibious landing at Saros Bay in the Aegean Sea against the resistance offered by the Green Forces. ADM Boorda ordered the units comprising each force to actively seek and "destroy" each other. Both task force commanders had full authority to engage the enemy when and where they deemed appropriate and to use all warfare assets at their disposal to achieve victory. Needless to say, all confrontations were intended to be simulated attacks.

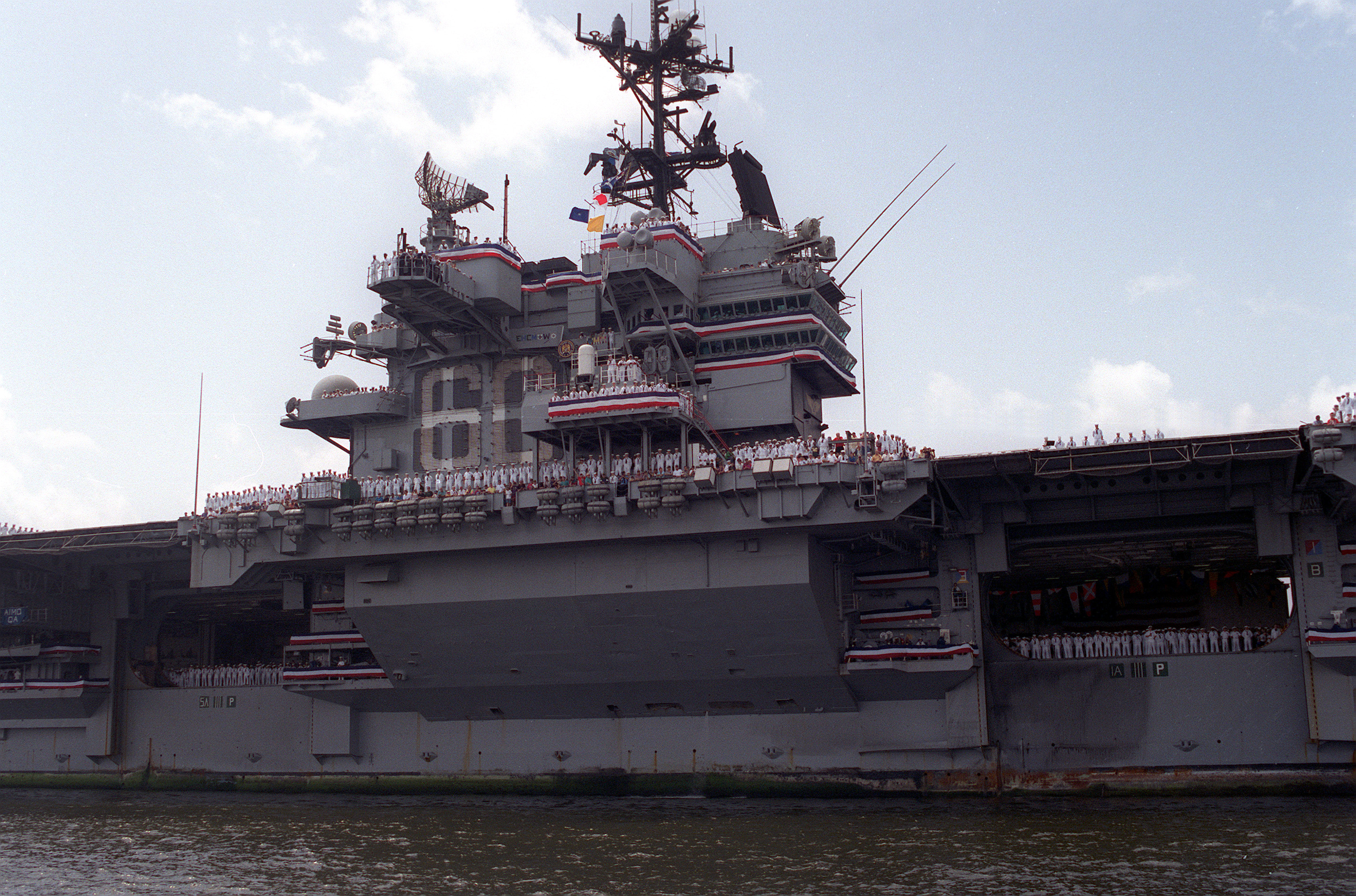
Saratoga comes alongside at Mayport at the end of her final cruise in June 1994.

While all the ships had a break (green period) and stationed off the coast, on 30 September 1992 the combat direction center tactical action officer (TAO) aboard Saratoga decided to launch a simulated attack on nearby opposition forces utilizing the RIM-7 Sea Sparrow missile system. After securing the approval of Saratoga's commanding officer and the battle group commander, RADM Philip Dur, the combat direction center officer implemented the simulated assault plan. Without providing prior notice, officers on Saratoga woke the enlisted Sea Sparrow missile team and directed them to conduct the simulated attack. Certain members of the missile firing team were not told that the exercise was a drill, rather than an actual event.

As the drill progressed, the combat direction center officer (TAO) used language to indicate he was preparing to fire a live missile, but due to the absence of standard terminology, the responsible officers failed to appreciate the significance of the terms used and the requests made. Specifically, and at the direct order of the TAO, the target acquisition system operator issued the command "arm and tune", terminology the console operators understood to require arming of the missiles in preparation for actual firing. The officers supervising the drill did not realize that "arm and tune" signified a live firing. As a result, shortly after midnight on the morning of 1 October, Saratoga fired two live Sea Sparrow missiles at Muavenet. The missiles struck Muavenet in the bridge, destroying it and the combat information center, killing five, including the commanding officer, and injuring most of the Turkish ship's officers. Navy officials recommended that the captain of the aircraft carrier Saratoga and seven other officers and sailors be disciplined for the missile firing, a recommendation which was followed through.

== Decommissioning and fate ==
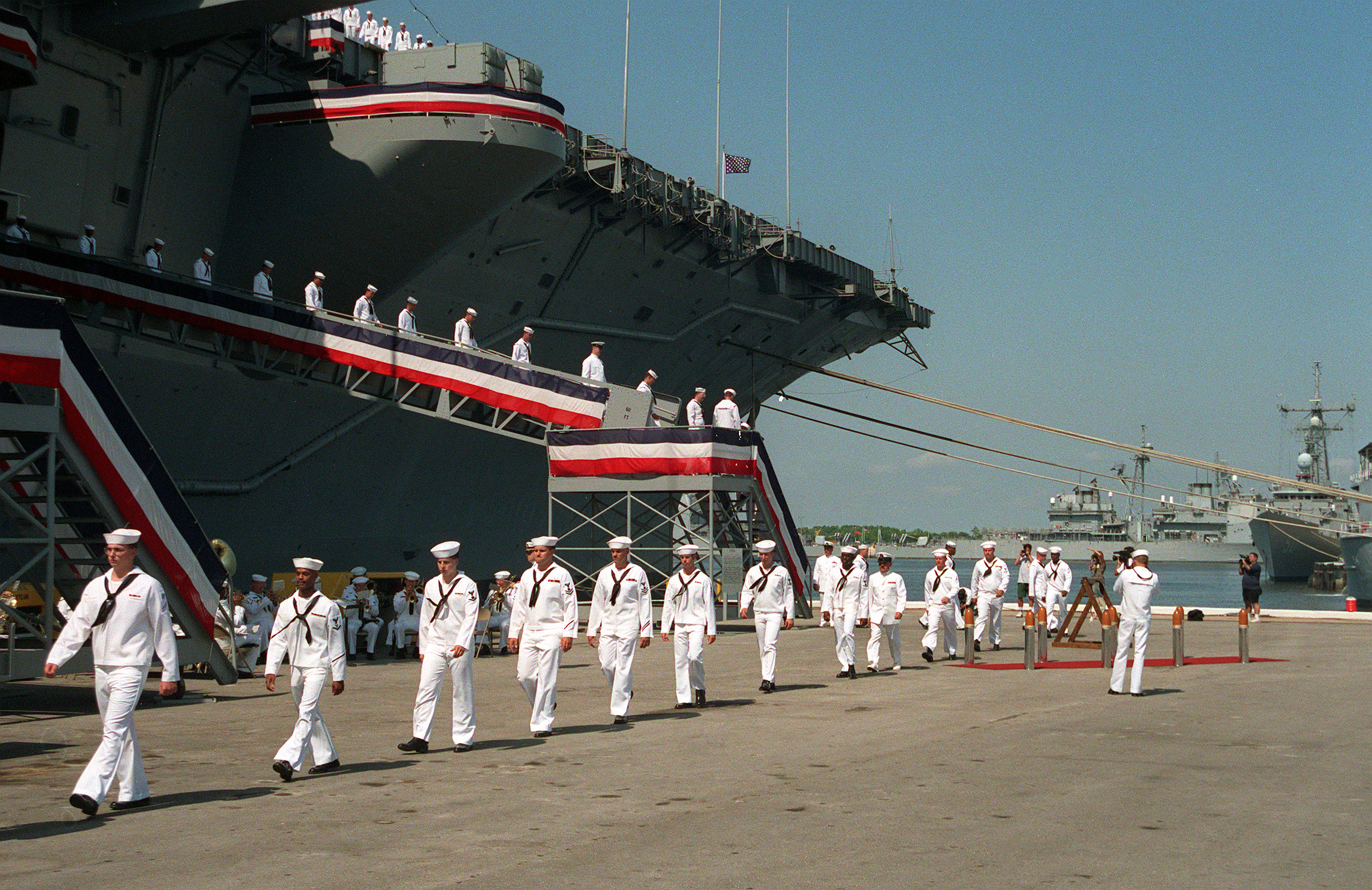
Ranks of enlisted crew members of Saratoga file off the ship for the last time at the end of the decommissioning ceremony.

Saratoga was decommissioned at the Naval Station, Mayport, Florida, on 20 August 1994, and stricken from the Naval Vessel Register the same day. She was towed to Philadelphia in May 1995, then, upon deactivation of the Philadelphia Navy Yard in August 1998, to Naval Station Newport in Newport, Rhode Island. There, she was first placed on donation hold, then her status was changed to "disposal as an experimental ship", and finally she was returned to donation hold on 1 January 2000. While a hulk at Newport, ex-Saratoga, like her sisters, was extensively stripped to support the active carrier fleet. There was an active effort to make her a museum ship in Quonset Point in North Kingstown, Rhode Island. In April 2010 Saratoga was removed from donation hold and scheduled to be disposed.

Efforts in 1994–95 to establish the ship as a museum in Jacksonville, Florida failed to raise even half of the start up costs. Jacksonville civic leaders attempted to raise funds, but the fundraising campaign, "Save Our Sara", fell short of the $3 million goal. Efforts were abandoned when startup costs increased from $4.5 million to $6.8 million. Officials had wanted to place the ship in downtown Jacksonville, on the St. Johns River along the Southbank Riverwalk.

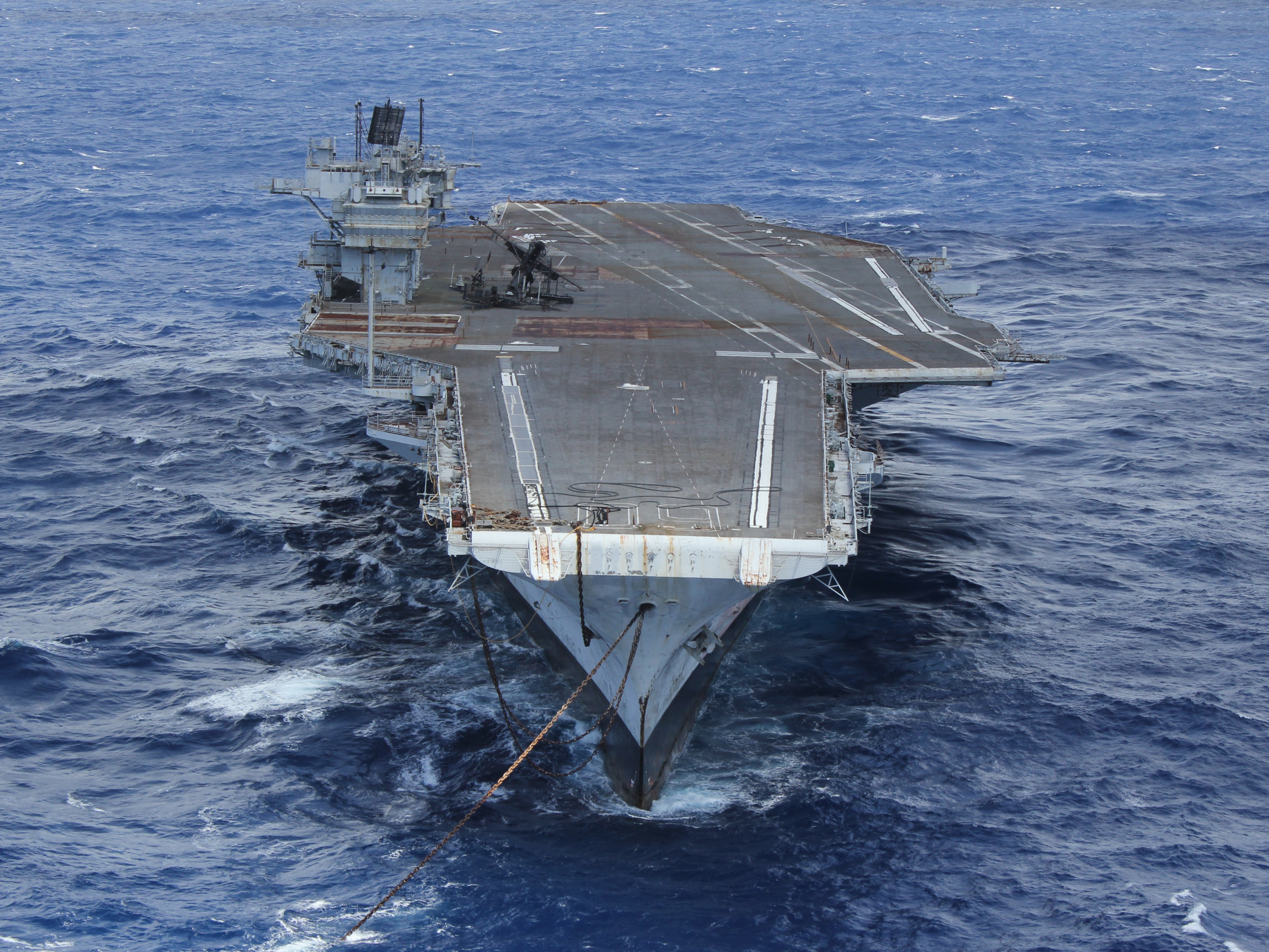
Saratoga under tow off the coast of North Carolina en route to be scrapped at Brownsville, Texas, in August 2014

A major hurdle was competition with the National Football League, who had awarded the city the Jacksonville Jaguars franchise in November 1993. To secure the team as part of the agreement with the NFL, the city had to ensure a large financial commitment to fund re-building of the city's stadium at a cost of $130 million during 1994. This severely limited the city's available funding and support of the "Save Our Sara" effort to bring Saratoga back to her home port. The Jacksonville USS Saratoga Museum Foundation, Inc ceased operating in the summer of 1995.

On 8 May 2014, Naval Sea Systems Command announced that ESCO Marine, Brownsville, Texas, would scrap Saratoga for one cent. This was the minimum amount that could be paid for scrapping the ship. On 21 August 2014, Saratoga departed Naval Station Newport and made its way down Narragansett Bay to the Atlantic Ocean, en route to the Esco Marine ship recycling plant in Brownsville, Texas. The vessel arrived at the scrapyard on 16 September for final scrapping. Scrapping was completed by 31 March 2019.

Both of Saratoga's anchors were reused on the 1998-commissioned USS Harry S. Truman.

== Notable naval officers ==
- ADM Jeremy Michael Boorda, ship was his flagship 1987; 25th Chief of Naval Operations
- VADM David Eugene Frost, The first Executive Officer, and interim Commanding Officer of United States Navy Strike Fighter Tactics Instructor program(The Navy's "Topgun" School). (CO of USS Saratoga August 1986 – March 1988; During that time, USS Saratoga won two consecutive Battle E's).
- CAPT Scott Speicher, Naval Aviator.
- RADM Jack M. James, Commanding Officer, 2 October 1964 – 2 September 1965
- VADM Joseph Scott Mobley (COMNAVAIRLANT), the U.S. military's last Vietnam prisoner of war (Shot Down: 24 June 1968/Released: 14 March 1973) Retired from active duty on 12 April 2001. (CO of USS Saratoga during Operation Desert Shield/Desert Storm).
- CAPT Frederick T. Moore Jr., commanding officer, November 1962 - September 1963

== See also ==
- List of aircraft carriers
- List of aircraft carriers of the United States Navy
