= USS Suribachi =

Ammunition ship of the US Navy

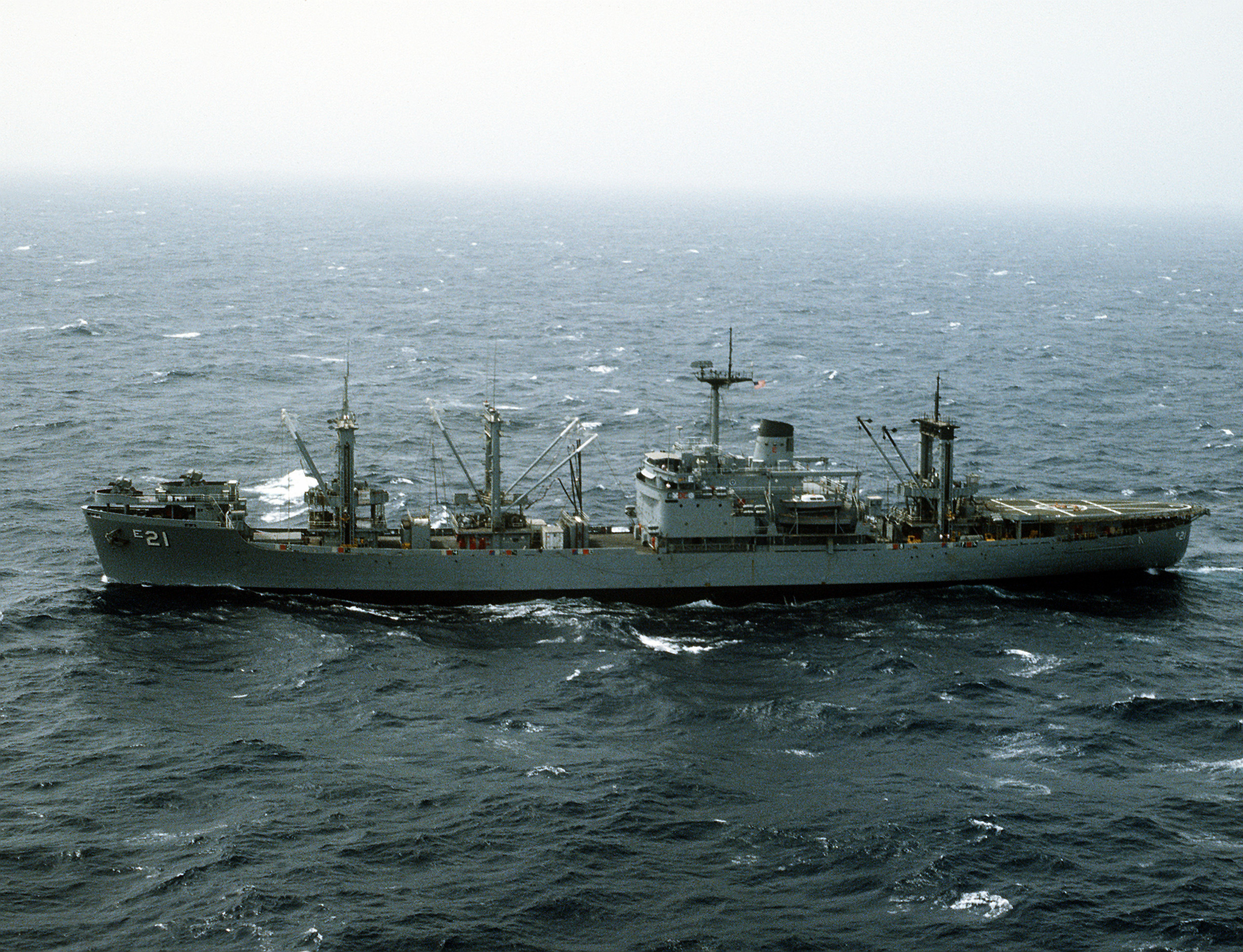
- USS Suribachi (AE-21)

History

United States
- Name: USS Suribachi
- Namesake: Mount Suribachi
- Builder: Bethlehem Sparrows Point Shipyard
- Laid down: 31 January 1955
- Launched: 2 November 1955
- Commissioned: 17 November 1956
- Decommissioned: 2 December 1994
- Stricken: 12 December 1996
- Motto: "THIS ROUNDS ON US"
- Nickname(s): "BACHI"
- Fate: Sold for scrapping, 2009

General characteristics
- Class & type: Suribachi-class ammunition ship
- Displacement: 9,758 long tons (9,915 t) light; 15,688 long tons (15,940 t) full
- Length: 512 ft (156 m)
- Beam: 72 ft
- Draught: 28 ft
- Propulsion: 2 × boilers; steam turbines; single shaft; 16,000 shp
- Speed: 20 knots (37 km/h)
- Complement: 20 officers; 324 enlisted
- Armament: 4 × twin 3 in (76 mm) 50 caliber guns

USS Suribachi (AE-21) was a Suribachi-class ammunition ship of the United States Navy. The ship was laid down on 31 January 1955 at Sparrows Point, Maryland, by Bethlehem Sparrows Point Shipyard, Inc.; launched on 2 November 1955; sponsored by Mrs. Lemuel C. Shepherd; and commissioned on 17 November 1956. She was named for the volcano of Iwo Jima, Mount Suribachi, the hill where the photograph Raising the Flag on Iwo Jima was taken.

== Service history ==
=== 1956–1960 ===
Between commissioning and August 1957, Suribachi completed fitting out and conducted shakedown training out of Guantanamo Bay Naval Base, Cuba. In September and October, she participated in three NATO exercises – Seaspray, Strikeback, and Pipedown – as flagship for the Underway Replenishment Group (URG). During the following year, she continued to operate along the east coast and in the Caribbean Sea undergoing a yard overhaul and training at Guantanamo Bay. In November 1958, Suribachi sailed on an extended tour of duty with the 6th Fleet. She cruised the Mediterranean until May 1960, taking time in June 1959 to serve as flagship for Service Squadron 2 during Operation Lantflex.

=== 1961–1972 ===
Suribachi deployed to the Mediterranean two more times, from February to August 1961 (under the command of Captain Frederick T. Moore, Jr) and from August 1962 until the spring of 1963, before entering the yard of the Maryland Shipbuilding and Drydock Co., at Baltimore, Maryland, for conversion to a Fast Automatic Shuttle Transfer ammunition ship (AE-FAST). At that time, she was placed in commission, in reserve. In addition to the FAST conversion, Suribachi received a helicopter platform on her fantail enabling her to conduct vertical replenishments for the fleet.

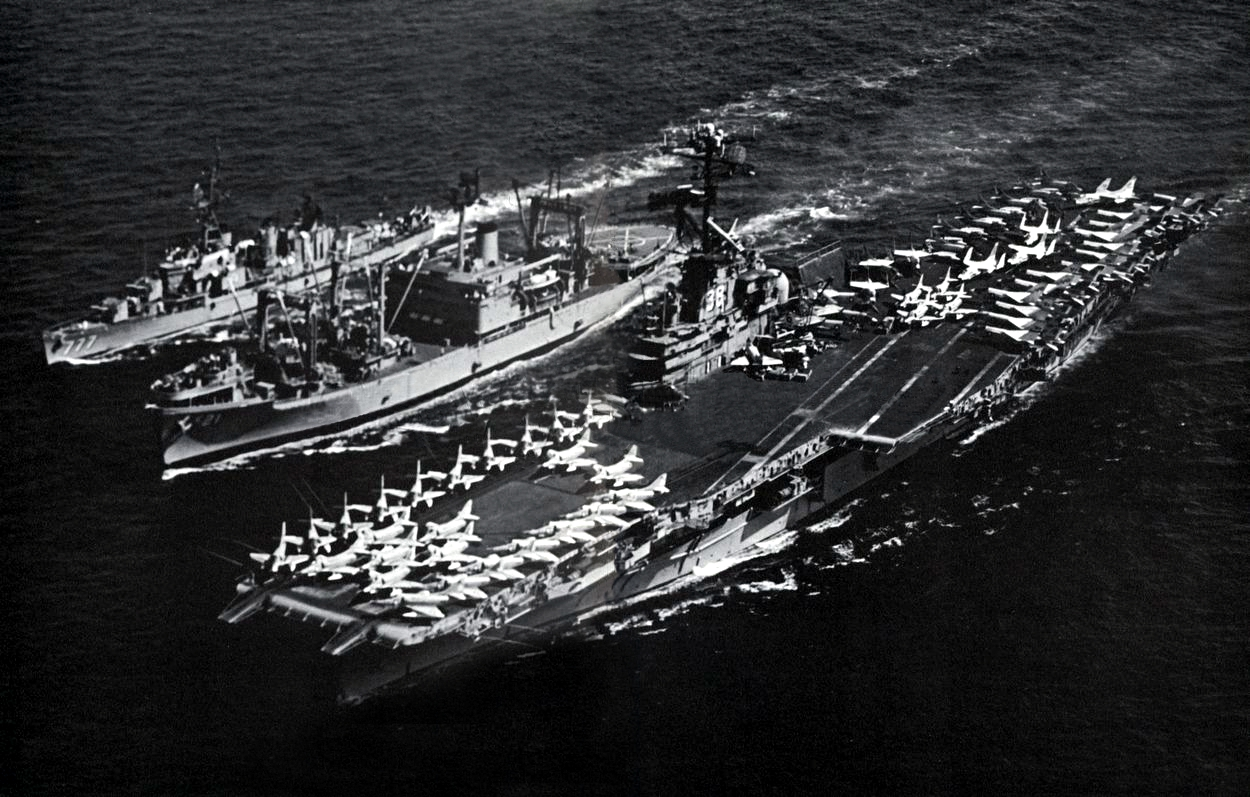
Suribachi replenishing Shangri-La and Zellars in the Mediterranean, 1968

On 15 December 1965, the ammunition ship was placed back in full commission at Norfolk, Virginia, where she continued fitting out until the beginning of February 1966. She then got underway for five weeks of shakedown training in the Caribbean area out of Guantanamo Bay. From mid-March to mid-April, she and USS Dewey conducted the operational evaluation of her newly installed FAST system, in the vicinity of Mayport, Florida. In June, she returned to her schedule of 6th Fleet deployments and Atlantic coast-Caribbean operations. Between June 1966 and June 1972, she made four more Mediterranean cruises, during which she visited many of the interesting ports along the littoral of the "middle sea". Her mission, as always, was to maintain the logistics support for the fleet at a high level of readiness. When not deployed with the 6th Fleet, she returned to operations along the eastern seaboard and trained in the Caribbean.

=== 1972–1975 ===
On 16 June 1972, Suribachi negotiated the locks of the Panama Canal and joined the Pacific Fleet. Ten days later, she arrived in Pearl Harbor. After an overnight stop, she continued on to the operating area off the coast of South Vietnam. From mid-July 1972 until 8 February 1973, Suribachi rearmed and refueled the combat units of the 7th Fleet. She departed from the combat zone fairly frequently for port period at Subic Bay in the Philippines and for a visit each to Hong Kong and Sattahip, Thailand. Her periods away from the action zone were brief in every instance, three or four days at most.

On 8 February 1973, she entered port at Subic Bay and, on the 16th, sailed for Yokosuka, Japan, en route back to the United States. Following stops there and at Pearl Harbor, Suribachi re-transited the Panama Canal in mid-March and rejoined the Atlantic Fleet. After returning to the east coast, Suribachi resumed her old schedule of operations in the western Atlantic-Caribbean area alternating with cruises with the 6th Fleet. She made one Mediterranean deployment, from January to June 1974, and was operating with the 2nd Fleet as of March 1975.

=== 1975–1994 ===
The Suribachi's duty port was changed from Mayport, Florida to Naval Weapons Station Earle in Leonardo, New Jersey. The 'Bachi' was an ammunition supply ship that carried significant amounts of fuel oil, ammunition, and potentially nuclear ordnance, (a point that cannot be confirmed or denied) and as such the ship almost never traveled with the fleet, given the risk. The ship housed Seamen, Firemen, and Gunners Mates, but had no complement of Marines. The Suribachi's sister ship was the USS Nitro, AE-23, which was also stationed at NWS Earle.

In 1978–79, the Suribachi was refitted in the Brooklyn Naval Yards. After a short stop in Earl, the "Bachi" went to Guantanamo for Sea Trials.

In Early October 1983, while the Suribachi was en route from its home port in Leonardo, NJ (Naval Weapons Station Earle) to Guantanamo Bay, Cuba for refresher training. Unbeknownst to most of the crew, her orders had been changed the night before pulling into "Gitmo". The Suribachi joined the USS Independence CV-62 task force including the USS Richmond K. Turner CG-20, USS Coontz DDG-40, USS Caron DD-970, USS Moosbrugger DD-980, USS Clifton Sprague FFG-16 steaming into position during the night of 24/25 Oct 83 for what was to become "Operation Urgent Fury" off the coast of the small Caribbean island of Grenada. This Operation would continue until 15 Dec 83. The USS Suribachi AE-21 departed after several weeks for Gitmo to return to her original orders which were ironically for "Refresher Training". The 'Bachi was the only ammunition ship involved in "OUF". The ship was awarded the Armed Forces Expeditionary Medal.

In September 1992, a U.S. Navy Boeing-Vertol CH-46D Sea Knight experienced a mechanical failure during an ammunition offload and crashed on the fantail of the Suribachi. The helicopter had launched from the aircraft carrier USS Dwight D. Eisenhower off the coast of Virginia. Fortunately, only one crewman was injured.

=== Decommissioning and sale ===
Suribachi was decommissioned in a ceremony at Leonardo, New Jersey on 2 December 1994, after 38 years of service, and was moored at the James River, Reserve Fleet site in Newport News, Virginia. On 8 June 2009, the ship was sold for scrapping.
