= Frederick T. Moore Jr. =

United States Navy officer (active 1937–1969)

- Captain U.S. Navy
- Born: May 18, 1914; Boston, Massachusetts, US
- Died: August 2, 1969 (aged 55); Pensacola, Florida, US
- Burial place: Barrancas National Cemetery; NAS Pensacola, Florida
- Military career
- Allegiance: United States of America
- Branch: United States Navy
- Service years: 1937–1969
- Rank: Captain
- Nickname: FT
- Commands: Air Group 35; Air Training Pensacola; USS Suribachi (AE-21); USS Saratoga (CV-60)
- Conflicts: World War II: Battle of Tarawa; Marianas; Battle of Guam; Battle of Leyte Gulf; Korean War Vietnam War
- Awards: Legion of Merit with Combat "V" (1); Air Medal (3); Commendation Ribbon with Combat "V"; Navy Unit Commendation (See Awards Section)
- Other work: Director - Pensacola Fiesta of Five Flags

Frederick T. Moore Jr. (May 18, 1914 – August 2, 1969) was a United States Navy captain. During World War II, he was executive officer of Fighter Squadron 1 operating off the carrier USS Yorktown (CV-10) and commanding officer of the Air Group 35 aboard the aircraft carrier USS Chenango in the Pacific. During the Korean War, he was the commanding officer of naval air training at NAS Pensacola and the air officer on USS Coral Sea. His first sea command was aboard USS Suribachi. In 1962–1963, Moore was the eighth commanding officer of USS Saratoga. Late in his career during the Vietnam War, he was chief of staff of the Naval Air Training Command at Naval Air Station Pensacola from October 1965 to July 1969.

== Early years ==
Moore was born in the Oak Square section of Brighton, Massachusetts, in Boston on May 18, 1914, the son of Frederick T. Moore Sr. and Susan Frances (O'Donnell) Moore. He was the second oldest of six children. His father was a regional sales representative for Dunlop tires. Moore came from a family whose roots in the United States go back to the 1630s and include ancestors who fought in the American Revolution at the Battles of Lexington and Concord, the Battle of Bunker Hill and the American Civil War.

Ensign Moore, naval aviator 1938

T. Moore played hockey in both high school and college. He attended Boston Latin School and Boston College graduating with a Bachelor of Arts degree in 1936.

During his scholastic years at Boston Latin, Moore was the top goal scorer of all the Boston high school ice hockey leagues. At Boston College, he was captain of the hockey team and a member of the football and golf teams. Moore was prominent in athletics and social affairs throughout his four years at the Boston College. One of his close lifelong friends from the class of 1936 at BC was Tip O'Neil, future Congressman from Massachusetts and Speaker of the US House of Representatives. Upon graduation, Moore reported to Naval Air Station Pensacola for flight training and was commissioned ensign, USNR and designated a Naval Aviator on August 1, 1938.

== Early naval career ==
Ensign Moore VF-5 USS Yorktown (CV-5)

In September 1938, Ensign Moore joined Fighting Squadron Five (VF-5) on board the USS Yorktown (CV-5) operating out of NAS North Island in San Diego, California. Ensign Moore flew off Yorktown from September 1938 thru September 1940. The primary aircraft flown by VF-5 in the late 1930s was the Grumman F3F, the last American biplane fighter aircraft.

During his assignment to VF5 and Yorktown on the West Coast, in December 1939, now Lieutenant (junior grade) Moore took leave to travel back to Boston to marry his longtime sweetheart, Catherine Mary Donovan from Dorchester, Boston, Massachusetts. They were married on December 26, 1939, at Saint Ambrose Church in Dorchester followed by a reception at the Copely Plaza in Copley Square in downtown Boston.

In May 1940, Moore was promoted to lieutenant. In October 1940, Moore was transferred back to NAS Pensacola as executive officer of the naval flight school. As the nations of the world moved toward World War II, Naval Air Station Pensacola once again became the hub of air training activities, training 1,100 cadets a month or 13,220 annually. Lieutenant Moore played a key role in making this massive ramp up in naval aviators to become known as one of 'the wonders of the modern world'.

== World War II ==
Lieutenant Moore on USS Yorktown (CV-10)

In March 1943, Lieutenant Moore moved to Pearl Harbor to meet with Fighter Squadron 1 and later that summer VF1 joined the new USS Yorktown (CV-10). The VF-1 squadron was established in March 1943, operating Grumman F6F Hellcats and was assigned to the United States Pacific Fleet to participate in numerous missions during World War II. With Lieutenant Moore as the executive officer, VF1 first fought the Japanese at the Battle of Tarawa, flying off USS Nassau from November 20 to November 22, 1943. The VF-1 squadron flew a total of 106 missions and spent 237 hours of flying time in three days of operations without losing a single plane or pilot.

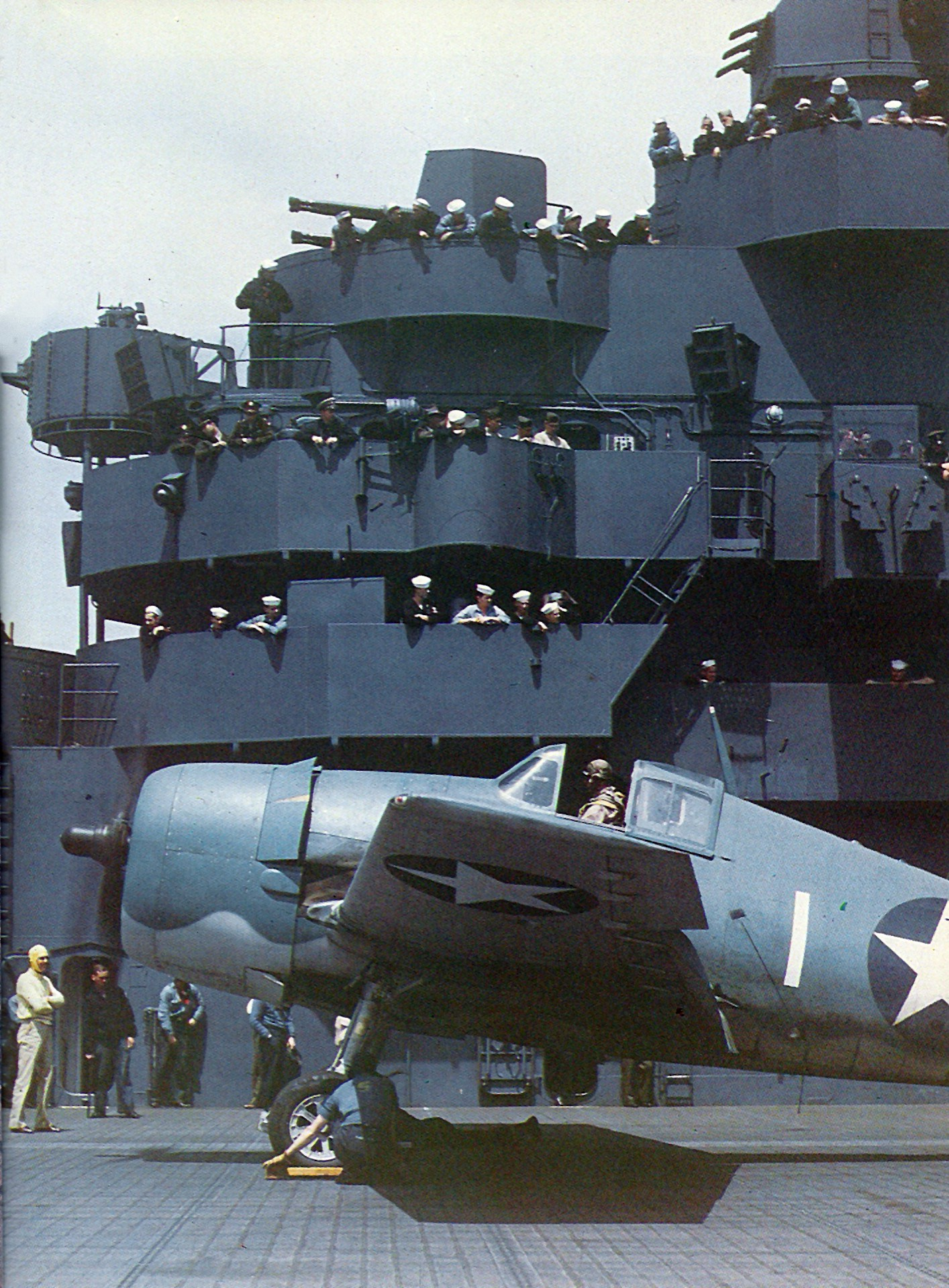
F6F-3 Hellcat on flight deck USS Yorktown (CV-10) 1943

Fighter Squadron 1 continued fighting off Yorktown with their Grumman F6F Hellcat aircraft in the Gilbert and Marshall Islands campaign, Marianas, Bonin Islands, and Caroline Islands. The squadron was both land based and carrier based and it did night fighting, day fighting, bombing, and escort work. Over a fifteen-month period, VF1 attacked the Imperial Japanese Navy, sank 8 ships and damaged 16. It destroyed 102 airborne enemy planes plus 20 probables while losing only 5 in aerial combat. VF1 also ruined 61 enemy planes on the ground, silenced 46 A-A batteries, and blew up or burned 10 fuel or ammunition dumps. In June 1943, Moore transferred from the USNR to USN.

Lieutenant Moore reported aboard USS Chenango in March 1944 as the commanding officer (CO) of Air Group 35. Chenango arrived at Espiritu Santo in April 1944 and sortied for the landings at Aitape and Hollandia and then joined the invasion of the Marianas. Air Group 35 crippled airfield installations, sank enemy shipping, and hammered harbor facilities on Pagan Island, as well as conducting valuable photographic reconnaissance on Guam. In May 1944, Moore was promoted to lieutenant commander.

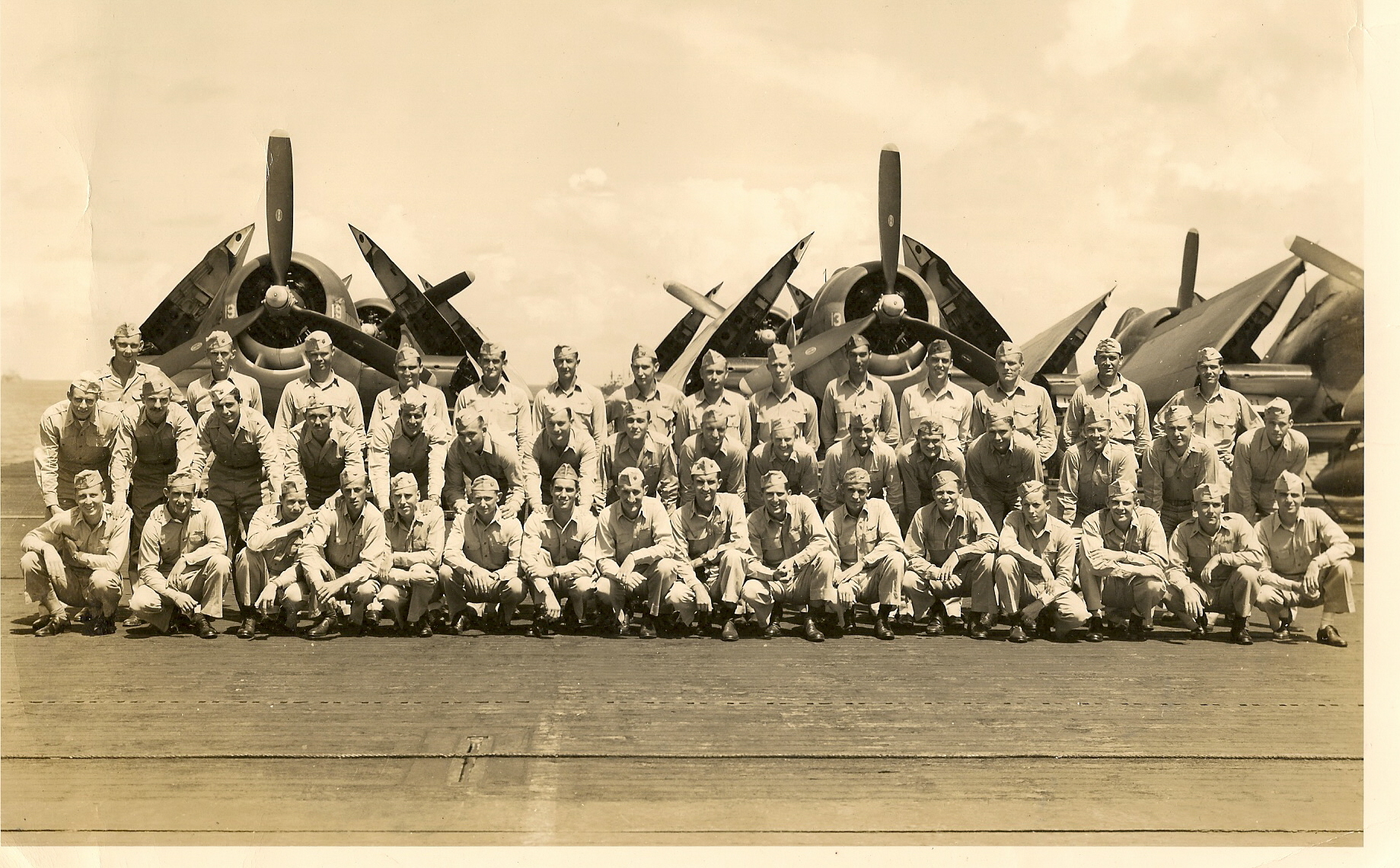
AG 35 on flight deck of USS Chenango

In June 1944, launching 32 planes in the attack on Pagan Island, Air Group 35 absolutely crippled Japanese airfield installations there, and shot up gun positions and personnel. At the Battle of Guam (1944), AG35 dropped 74 tons of bombs, destroying many Japanese gun emplacements, troop concentrations, bridges, and truck convoys. A desperately needed Japanese ammunition storage dump exploded with spectacular violence. In October 1944, Chenango Hellcats conducted softening up strikes on Leyte in preparation for the invasion landings at the Battle of Leyte Gulf. Air Group 35 shot down 93 Japanese planes and sunk or destroyed 91 ships. AG35 lost only five pilots. Throughout its thirteen months of flying through the fiercest kind of anti-aircraft fire, Air Group 35 flew 4,644 sorties in combat zones and not one enemy plane or submarine succeeded in damaging the US surface vessels that AG35 was covering.

== Post World War II naval assignments ==
- January 1945 – June 1946 – Training - Fighter Squadrons Chief of Naval Operations – Washington, D.C.
- July 1946 – June 1947 - General Line School - Naval Station Newport, Rhode Island
- July 1947 – Advanced to rank of commander
- July 1947 – December 1949 - Commander FASRON 11 - NAS North Island, San Diego, California & Ford Island, Pearl Harbor, Hawaii
- January 1950 – May 1950 - Joint Forces Staff College – Naval Station Norfolk, Virginia
- June 1950 – December 1951 – Commanding officer air training - Naval Air Station Pensacola, Florida
- January 1952 – June 1953 air officer - USS Coral Sea - Naval Station Norfolk, Virginia
- July 1953 – July 1954 – Student – Naval War College – Naval Station Newport, Rhode Island
- August 1954 – July 1956 – Faculty Staff - Naval War College – Naval Station Newport, Rhode Island
- August 1956 – February - 1958 operations officer - Commander Carrier Division 4 (Com Car Div 4), USS Forrestal - Naval Station Norfolk, Virginia
- July 1957 – Advanced to rank of captain
- March 1958 – November 1958 - Assistant Head Special Weapons Branch Chief of Naval Operations, Washington, DC
- December 1958 – August 1961 - Navy Rep to Atomic Branch, Joint Chiefs of Staff – The Pentagon
- August 1961 – October 1962 - Commanding officer – USS Suribachi – Naval Weapons Station Earle, New Jersey
- November 1962 – September 1963 – Commanding officer – USS Saratoga - Mayport, Florida

== Commanding officer - USS Saratoga (CV-60) ==
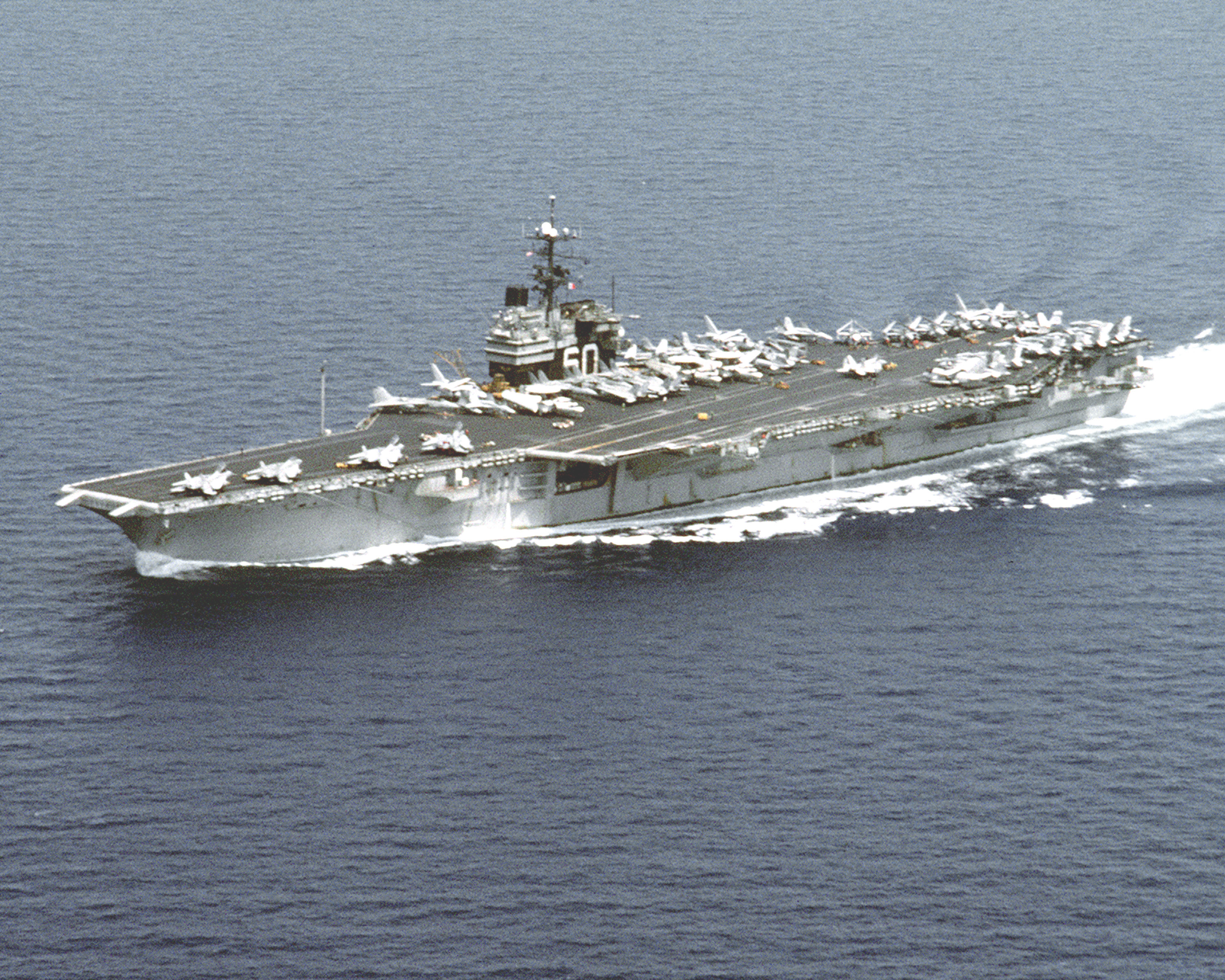
USS Saratoga

Captain Moore was the eighth commanding officer of USS Saratoga, one of the most powerful 'super carrier' warships in the world at the time, homeported in Mayport, Florida. The first deployment for Moore after he took command was to sail to the Caribbean Sea in December 1962 to conduct flight operations off the coast of Cuba. Although the flash points of the Cuban Missile Crisis had cooled a month earlier, the United States wanted to maintain a presence in the area until all of the Soviet Union missile sites were fully dismantled. This was called the Cuban Quarantine Operation. In late 1962, Saratoga remained "on the line" in the waters off Cuba. During this time, a Russian ship was spotted moving toward Cuba – and the embargo line where it would turn back or be challenged by American ships. Saratoga crew scrambled to battle stations as general quarters was ordered by Moore. The fighter jets on the flight deck readied for launch. [Moore was about to be tested in a potentially large-scale international incident and he wasn't about to back down.] The Russian ship quickly turned around and sailed away. Although the crisis ended in late December 1962, the American ships, including Saratoga, remained in the area through the winter. Saratoga received an Armed Forces Expeditionary Medal for the 3–20 December 1962 period that she was "on-line" in the waters off Cuba.

Captain Moore on USS Saratoga bridge

Saratoga deployed to the Mediterranean Sea from March 1963 through October 1963. When not conducting flight operations underway, Saratoga entered several ports on the mission of goodwill ambassador for the United States. Ports visited were: Marseille; Barcelona; Cannes; Naples; Athens; Taranto; Genoa; Istanbul; Palma de Mallorca; Palermo; Venice; Capri; and Gibraltar.

While operating in the Mediterranean Sea off the coast of France, a Grumman E-1 Tracer landed on the deck of Saratoga, logging the carrier's 69,000th arrested landing. Later on the cruise, the 72,000th arrested landing was made with a Douglas A-1 Skyraider off the coast of Italy. Newest addition to the "Ten Thousand Trap Club" was Moore, who was credited with 10,000 arrested landings when a McDonnell F3H Demon landed on the carrier in the Mediterranean. Yet another milestone was reached on the 1963 cruise with the 76,000th landing aboard Saratoga.

== Late naval career ==
- October 1963 – January 1965 – Chief of Staff - Carrier Division Six- USS Independence and USS Shangri-La – Mayport, FL

In September 1964, Moore, aboard USS Independence in the Norwegian Sea, quarterbacked the NATO Strike Force in exercise "Teamwork". There were scores of NATO cruisers, destroyers and carriers, including the world's largest cruiser USS Newport News. Russia had injected operational reality into the war games. Moore had to contend with Soviet destroyers and planes taking position among and over the NATO fleet. Moore was chief of staff to Rear Admiral Robert L. Townsend, commander of NATO Carrier Strike Forces - Atlantic and commander of Carrier Division Six. Moore called the plays from the bridge of USS Independence and this was the first time that Soviet air and sea forces had observed carrier striking forces in simulated actions. He was convinced that such actions as the Tonkin Gulf assault on North Vietnam and the Cuban Blockade in late 1962, in which Moore commanded Saratoga, had created newborn respect by Russia for US aircraft carrier power. Moore disclosed that every Soviet plane approaching the fleet on daily incursions had been detected and intercepted by his jet fighters. In real warfare, the American jets could have destroyed the Soviet invaders more than 100 miles away before they could attack the NATO fleet.

- February 1965 – October 1965 - Joint Chiefs of Staff – service staff officer - The Pentagon
- October 1965 – June 1969 - Chief of Staff – Naval Air Training Command – Naval Air Station Pensacola

The mission of training prospective aviators and naval flight officers comes under the cognizance of Chief of Naval Air Training Command (CNATRA). As chief of staff (COS) – CNATRA, Moore was the commander's principal assistant for directing, coordinating, supervising, and training the staff. Naval pilot training requirements shifted upward to meet the demands for the Vietnam War which occupied much of the 1960s and 1970s. Annual pilot production was as high as 2,552 (1968) and as low as 1,413 (1962). Moore received a second Legion of Merit for meritorious conduct as the COS for CNATRA from November 1965 to July 1969 directing the training operations at 22 naval air stations throughout the United States and being liaison officer with 13 commercial airports during the Viet Nam War

== Personal life ==
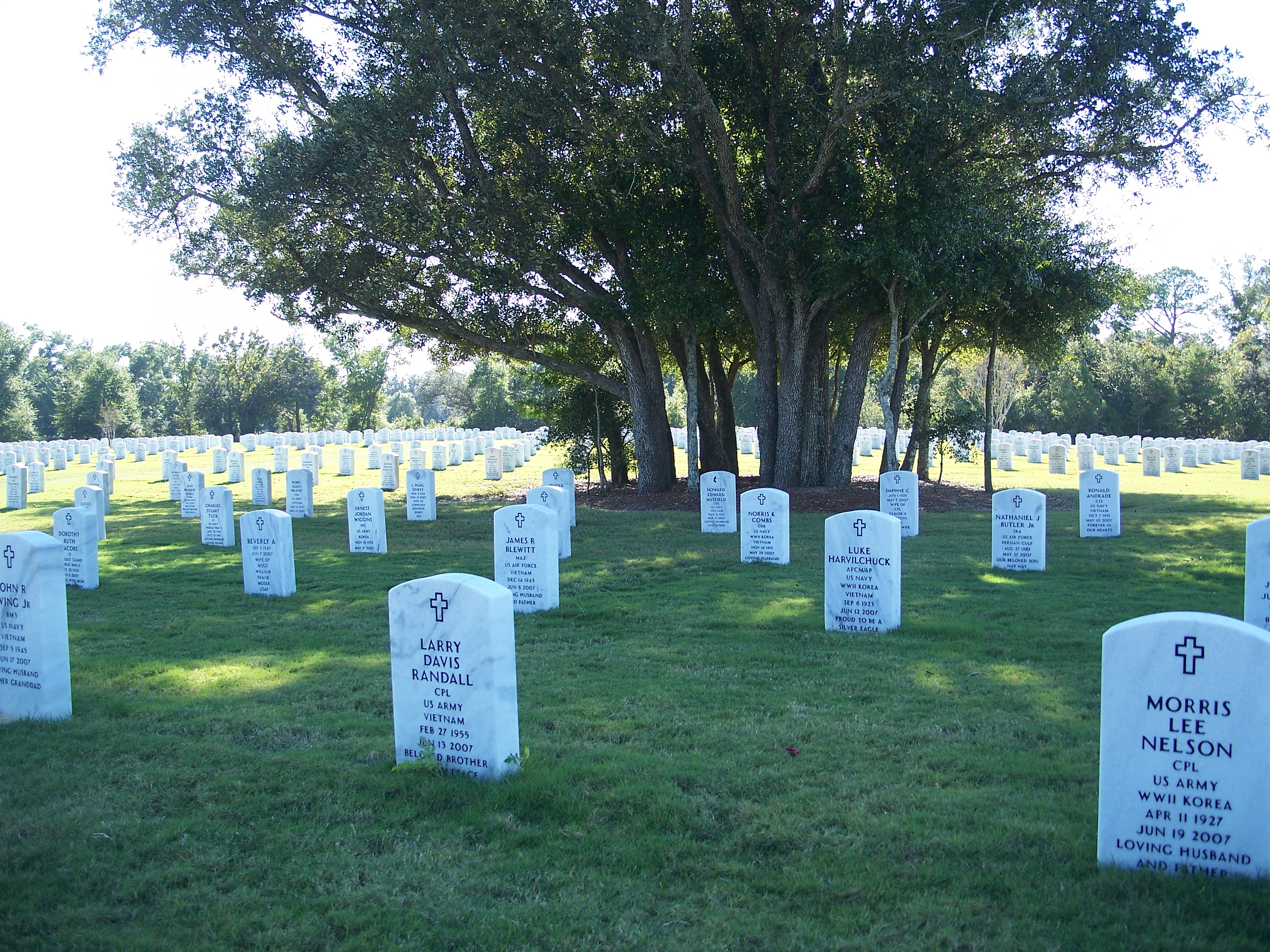
Barrancas National Cemetery Naval Air Station Pensacola

Moore had several great values, including duty, honor, service, compassion and love of family and country. After 32 years of service to his country, Moore retired in June 1969 and died of a heart attack in August 1969 at the age of 55. Moore is buried at the Barrancas National Cemetery at NAS Pensacola. He was survived by his wife Catherine M. (Donovan) Moore, who died in February 2007 and is buried alongside her beloved husband at Barrancas National Cemetery. Captain and Mrs. Moore had seven children: Maureen C. Sullivan of Annandale, VA; Frederick T. Moore III of Jacksonville, FL; Michael D. Moore of Maynard, MA; Susan F. Ferrell of Logan, WV; Patricia E. Moore of Alexandria, VA; Christopher G. Moore of Asbury Park, NJ; and Timothy X. Moore of Washington, DC. They are also survived by thirteen (13) grandchildren and twenty (20) great-grandchildren.

== Lineage ==
During the Vietnam War, Moore was proud to have two sons and two sons-in-law serving on active duty in the United States Navy. His oldest son, Commander Frederick T. Moore III, USN-Ret, graduated from the Aviation Officers Candidate School (AOCS) in Pensacola in November 1968. Upon receiving his Naval Aviator Wings in July 1969, he was a flight instructor in Pensacola. Commander Moore took leave from the Navy, was ordained a Catholic priest in August 1975 and re-entered the Navy as a chaplain. Of his numerous assignments, two included Chaplain - Saratoga and Chaplain - US Naval Academy. After twenty years of service, Commander Moore retired in 1993. His second oldest son, Lieutenant Michael D. Moore, USNR-Ret, graduated from the Aviation Officers Candidate School (AOCS) in Pensacola in December 1966. After primary flight training, Lieutenant Moore operated off USS Wasp based at the Boston Navy Yard and Quonset Point, RI.

Moore's first son-in-law, Lieutenant Commander D. Michael Ferrell, USNR-Ret, graduated from the US Naval Academy in June 1968. Lieutenant Commander Ferrell served on several surface Navy vessels on the East and West coasts, including USS Gray and USS Point Defiance and was a Naval Aide at the Pentagon. His second son-in-law, Commander Kevin Moore, USN-Ret, graduated from the US Naval Academy in June 1968. He served a first tour in jet fighters (F-4 Phantoms), deploying to Vietnam for two deployments on board USS Coral Sea. During Commander Moore's second deployment in 1972, considerable combat time was spent over North Vietnam. He was forced to eject once and also shot down an enemy aircraft over North Vietnam. He attended Naval Postgraduate School in Monterey, California earning a master's degree, served squadron duty on board USS Midway, and taught at the US Naval Academy in 1979–1980. From 1981 to 1983, Commander Moore was assigned to Naval Station Norfolk, VA as part of the commissioning crew for the Navy's newest aircraft carrier, USS Carl Vinson. After twenty years of service in the Navy, Commander Kevin Moore retired in 1988.

== Awards ==
For his command of Air Group 35 in the Pacific theater from March to November 1944, Moore was awarded the Legion of Merit with Combat "V" and the Air Medal with three gold award stars. His citation commended his leadership of aerial operations against Japanese-held positions across Palau, New Guinea, the Marianas, Halmahera, and Leyte.

Gold Award Star in lieu of the Second Legion of Merit. Moore received a second Legion of Merit for meritorious conduct as the chief of staff for the commander of naval air training from November 1965 to July 1969 directing the training operations at 22 naval air stations throughout the United States and being liaison officer with 13 commercial airports during the Viet Nam War.

Air Medal "For meritorious achievement in aerial flight as Commander Air Group, THIRTY FIVE in action against enemy Japanese forces at Pagan Island, on June 22, 1944. A fearless and aggressive leader, Lieutenant Commander Moore repeatedly braved enemy antiaircraft fire to lead a series of vigorous attacks against hostile shipping and installations contributing to the success of his flight in burning three Japanese cargo vessels and in damaging personnel and positions. This action contributed materially to the support of our forces at Saipan Island. By his courage and expert airmanship, Lieutenant Commander Moore upheld the highest traditions of the United States Service"

Gold Award Star in lieu of second Air Medal: "For meritorious achievement in the performance of duty as Commander Air Group THIRTY-FIVE in combat operations against the enemy in the Marianas Islands, from June 23 to August 1, 1944. By his initiative, leadership and outstanding ability he discharged his duties as Air Group Commander with exceptional merit. While acting as Air Coordinator at Guam, his skill and determination on more than one occasion resulted in the severe loss to the enemy and greatly aided the advance of our troops toward important objectives. His actions contributed materially to the success of this operation and his conduct was at all times in keeping with the highest traditions of naval service."

Gold Award Star in lieu of Third Air Medal: "For meritorious achievement in aerial flight as Pilot of a Fighter Plane in Fighting Squadron ONE, attached to the USS Nassau (CVE-16), during operations against enemy Japanese forces in the Pacific WAR Area [at Tarawa] from November 20 to 22, 1943. Completing his fifth mission during this period, Commander (then Lieutenant) Moore contributed materially to the infliction of damage to the enemy. His airmanship, courage and devotion to duty in the face of hostile antiaircraft fire were in keeping with the highest traditions of United States Naval Service."

Gold Award Star in lieu of Fourth Air Medal: "For meritorious achievement in aerial flight as Pilot of a Fighter Plane in Fighting Squadron ONE, during operations against enemy Japanese forces in the Pacific WAR Area [Gilbert and Marshall Islands] from November 22, 1943 to January 12, 1944. Completing his tenth mission during this period, Commander (then Lieutenant) Moore contributed materially to the infliction of damage to the enemy. His airmanship, courage and devotion to duty in the face of hostile antiaircraft fire were in keeping with the highest traditions of United States Naval Service."

He also received a Letter of Commendation with authorization to wear the Commendation Ribbon and Combat "V" and is entitled to the ribbon for, and a facsimile of the Navy Unit Commendation awarded to the USS CHENANGO.

In addition to the Legion of Merit with Combat "V" and one Gold Star, the Air Medal with three Gold Stars, the Commendation Ribbon with Combat "V" and the Navy Unit Commendation Ribbon, Moore has the American Defense Service Medal with one silver star and one bronze star (six operations); the American Campaign Medal; the Asiatic-Pacific Campaign Medal; the World War II Victory Medal; the Navy Occupation Service Medal, Europe Clasp; the National Defense Service Medal; and the Philippine Liberation Ribbon.

Naval Aviator Wings

- Legion of Merit with Combat "V" for Valor with one gold award star
- Air Medal with three gold award stars
- Commendation Ribbon with Combat "V"
- Navy Unit Commendation
- American Defense Service Medal with one silver award star and one bronze award star
- American Campaign Medal
- Asiatic-Pacific Campaign Medal
- World War II Victory Medal
- Navy Occupation Service Medal
- National Defense Service Medal
- Philippine Liberation Medal
