= Stan Lee Media productions =

Some of Stan Lee Media's most important projects included the animated web series 7th Portal (where Stan Lee himself voiced the character Izayus), The Drifter, and The Accuser. The 7th Portal characters were licensed to an interactive 3D movie attraction in four Paramount theme parks.

During Chapter 11 debtor in possession proceedings following the company's bankruptcy, Stan Lee assigned the major character franchises he created to his new public company POW! Entertainment without the knowledge or approval of the Bankruptcy court. Courts later determined that Lee and his new partner Arthur Lieberman failed to disclose the existence and value of the Rights Assignment Lee made to the company when he founded it.

== The Drifter ==
The Drifter was created by Stan Lee and co-developed by Steve Gerber and Taylor Grant. The story revolved around a character called "The Drifter" who can travel through time with the aid of a device called the decoder (which resembled a black semisphere with colored buttons). Viewers of the series were called true believers.

A series of twelve animated webisodes were set to stream Sci-Fi's website in 2001, though only one saw release. In late 2000, a revamped live action version of the concept was created, based on the characters but notably different in its story. Discussions with Sci-Fi/USA were ongoing to create the series for television, however, the collapse of Stan Lee Media shelved the project. At the time, fan response to a detailed preview on IGN Filmforce was notable; though, the series was never to surface again.

== The Backstreet Project ==
=== Main plot ===
The story depicts a reality where the Backstreet Boys are superheroes called the Cyber Crusaders.

=== Characters ===
Cyber Crusaders
Name	Superhero form	Superpower	Voice actor
Nick Carter	Ninja Man	Lightning-Quick Martial Arts ability	Himself
Howie Dorough	Illusioneer	Skills of illusion and mental telepathy	Himself
AJ McLean	Ordnance	Unbearing marksmanship	Himself
Brian Littrell	Top Speed	Able to generate spheres of energy	Himself
Kevin Richardson	Power Lord	Super-Strength	Himself
Zanell	Unknown	Psychokinesis	Christina Gordon

== The Accuser ==
The Accuser was created by Stan Lee and co-developed by Roy Johansen, Taylor Grant and Steve Gerber. It starred a character who took justice into his own hands. The Accuser is a science-fiction series starring Richard Clarkin as Dan Mason, Jason Barr as the Corporal, Ray Landry as the Doctor, Tony Daniels as the Fullbright, Lawrence Bayne as Charlie Johnson Savitch, and Susan Roman as Fore.

=== Plot ===
At the first chapter starts, we see a recently hospitalized Dan Mason recalling his past as the best criminal defense attorney money could buy. He usually didn't care about whose money was buying him and taught himself not to know what his clients do after being acquitted. At the cost of his own wife Lucia, Dan learns the underworld's gratitude isn't long-lasting.

One of his clients (upset that he agreed to defend Lucas Cortex) tried to have him killed. As a result, Dan is now a full-time wheelchair-using widower. In the hospital, Dan said he'd give his soul in exchange for a chance to bring justice. A mysterious entity accepts the deal and gives Dan a special wheelchair that can be converted into a special armor that will move his legs for him. This leads to Dan becoming the Accuser who fights crime. What Dan doesn't know is that his mysterious benefactor is evaluating him for some unknown agenda.

== Other projects ==
Other productions included the Evil Clone —a purported attempt to clone Stan Lee as a cartoon that wackily criticized many aspects of the media, including happy endings, the StanLeeMedia.net website—, and The Backstreet Project, a project including the Backstreet Boys. Different editions on The Backstreet Project comic books were released on the market. Six webisodes were also released in 1999 via StanLeeMedia.net.
