= The 7th Portal =

Animated series

- Also known as: The Seventh Portal
- Genre: Animation; Action; Fantasy
- Created by: Stan Lee
- Developed by: Bryce Zabel
- Screenplay by: Brian L. Davidson; Taylor Grant
- Starring: Lawrence Bayne; Tony Daniels; Carlos Diaz; Richard Eden; Christina Gordon; Shannon Lawson; Stan Lee; Julie Lemieux; Joseph Motiki; Ellora Patnaik; Jovanni Sy; Peter Wildman; Gordon Michael Woolvett
- Composer: Robert J. Walsh
- Country of origin: United States
- Original language: English
- No. of seasons: 1
- No. of episodes: 22

Production
- Producer: Stan Lee
- Running time: ≈ 5 minutes
- Production company: Stan Lee Media, Inc

Original release
- Network: Shockwave
- Release: February 29, 2000 – 2000

The 7th Portal is an American animated web series produced by Stan Lee in 1999. It was the first global team of cyber Super Heroes produced by Stan Lee. The main content of the series is an Internet-based adventure in which six characters from all over the world who got their super powers in cyberspace are drawn into the Web and must fight super villains.

The 7th Portal premiered on the new animation hub Shockwave, on February 29, 2000, when its global launch overwhelmed Macromedia's servers. It became the most successful web originated animated series, being picked up by Fox in mid run, for distribution on TV in South America and Europe. Twenty-two episodes were made, of which the first twenty were shown on-line before the website went bankrupt. The final two episodes were only visible on television.

== Main plot ==
The 7th Portal told the story of Izayus (voiced by Stan Lee) when he approaches a young beta tester named Peter Littlecloud. He claims to have a game that will let him and his friends fight real monsters, which he projects holographically using the CD-ROM he claims contains the game. The game's premise is that there are six other dimensions, all of which have been conquered by the evil Lord Mongorr (who was Izayus's brother). The players need to take the form of a superhero in order to stop him from opening the portal to the seventh universe, their own.

After they have chosen their form, Peter, Roberto, and Greta are sucked into the computer screen, wherein time they learn that they've been transported for real into the parallel universe of Darkmoor. Also, they have been transformed into their superhero forms. Peter is the Thunderer, Roberto is Oxblood, and Greta is Gossamer. Despite their impressive powers, the heroes find that their forms are still subject to the rules of the game such as spending Life Points to use their superpowers. They are eventually captured and brought to The Bloodzone, a gladiator-like arena consisting of floating platforms over a spiked pit.

Meanwhile, Rikio, Ozubo, and Anna are confused by their friends' disappearance. Suddenly, they are transported into cyberspace to meet Izayus. He reveals to them that the CD was actually the half of The Artifact, a mysterious device that grants unlimited power to the one who gathers the two pieces. Izayus has the red half, which symbolizes life and allows transportation between Earth and Darkmoor; while Mongorr has the blue half which symbolizes death and kills anyone who touches it without the red half. Izayus uses the Artifact's red half to transform Rikio, Ozubo, and Anna into their respective superhero forms, The Streak, Conjure Man, and Imitatia.

Thunderer, Oxblood, and Gossamer discover that they must fight the Nullifiers (as Mongorr's select group of minion's call themselves) members Bearhug and Mongorr's daughter Vendetta to the death if they want to leave the Bloodzone. When Thunderer loses all his Life Points transforming back into Peter, Izayus appears and heals Gossamer. After Izayus was impaled by the Nullifier Whipsaw, Mongorr attacked Whipsaw and healed Izayus upon his capture while the Data Raiders escape with The Artifact. The Nullifiers try to stop them when the heroes are saved by The Streak, Conjure Man and Imitatia.

The heroes take the name Data Raiders for themselves and hide in a basement. A fight breaks out among them because Peter had transferred Oxblood's Life Points to his own so that he could transform into Thunderer again. This left Oxblood at zero points and transformed him back into Roberto at the cost of his scanner which is crushed by the Nullifier Krog during battle. Roberto knocks Thunderer and leaves. Knocked out, Thunderer reverts into Peter. The others, however, notice that Peter's Life Points are increasing, and hypothesize that if they get something to eat they'll be able to increase their Life Points even faster. Roberto is captured by the Nullifiers, who used him as mind-controlled bait to capture the Data Raiders. When the Data Raiders return with the food, they are attacked by the Nullifiers and are forced to surrender. With the assembled Artifact, Mongorr sends the Data Raiders back to Earth, stripping them of their powers.

Shortly afterward, he proceeds to send an army through it to destroy several of the Earth's landmarks. However, Izayus sends some of his energy through the portal, returning the Data Raiders' powers to full strength (and even restoring Roberto's scanner), and they return through the portal. The Data Raider free Izayus and defeat the Nullifiers. Izayus then destroys Mongorr and claims the Artifact using it to repair all the damage Mongorr has caused to the multiverse for in Izayus's words, "it will be as if Mongorr never existed." As a reward, the Data Raiders get to keep their powers and return to Earth. The series ends with Izayus saying that Earth and the 7th Portal will always need heroes such as the Data Raiders.

== Characters ==
=== Data Raiders ===
Most of the Data Raiders are from outside the United States, with Thunderer being the sole exception. Initially, the characters speak English with foreign accents, which is later dropped.

- Peter Littlecloud / Thunderer (voiced by Gordon Michael Woolvett) is a hero from the United States who possesses superhuman breath. He is the leader of the Data Raiders who works as a beta tester.
- Ozubo Monduma / Conjure Man (voiced by Joseph Motiki) is a hero from South Africa who possesses magic-based abilities and psychokinesis.
- Greta Brecht / Gossamer (voiced by Christina Gordon) is a ghost-like hero from Germany who possesses flight, intangibility, and invisibility.
- Anna Nehue / Imitatia (voiced by Ellora Patniak) is a hero from India who possesses shapeshifting abilities.
- Roberto Diaz / Oxblood (voiced by Carlos Diaz) is a hero from Brazil who possesses superhuman strength and durability. He is themed after an ox and sports horn-like hair and a nose ring.
- Rikio Minamoto / The Streak (voiced by Jovanni Sy) is a hero from Japan who possesses superhuman speed.
- Izayus (voiced by Stan Lee) is Mongorr's brother and benefactor of the Data Raiders. He possesses psychokinesis.

=== Nullifiers ===
- Lord Mongorr (voiced by Richard Eden) is the ruler of Darkmoor, leader of the Nullifiers, and the brother of Izayus. He possesses psychokinetic powers. Mongor has conquered six dimensions and needs to access the 7th Portal in order to conquer Earth.
- Vendetta (voiced by Julie Lemieux) is Mongorr's daughter and second-in-command who dresses like a snake. She also possesses psychokinetic powers.
- Bearhug (voiced by Lawrence Bayne) is a dwarfish-looking man with enough strength to suffocate someone by embracing them. He is protective of Vendetta.
- Krog (voiced by Tony Daniels) is an indestructible, blue rock monster who is the largest of the Nullifiers.
- Slyme (voiced by Tony Daniels) is a Nullifier with the ability to manipulate slime. He carries around on a shovel and a "bag of souls", containing souls that he can control as long as the bag is in his possession.
- Vultura (voiced by Shannon Lowsan) is a vulture-themed woman with wing-like webbing between her arms and feet which enables her to fly.
- Whipsaw (voiced by Peter Wildman) is a Rawyan with a scarred face who wields a whip with a sharp pointed end. Whipsaw previously betrayed his species to Mongorr.
- The Decimators are the robotic foot soldiers of the Nullifiers.

== Episodes ==
=== Season 1 (2000) ===
Episode	Title	Written by	Produced by	Original release date
1	"Let the game begin!"	Stan Lee and Bryce Zabel	Stan Lee	N/A
2	"Enter Darkmoor"	Stan Lee and Bryce Zabel	Stan Lee	N/A
3	"First Landing"	Stan Lee and Bryce Zabel	Stan Lee	N/A
4	"Mercy Killing"	Stan Lee and Bryce Zabel	Stan Lee	N/A
5	"Out Of Time"	Stan Lee and Bryce Zabel	Stan Lee	N/A
6	"Trap Door pt 1 of 2"	Stan Lee and Bryce Zabel	Stan Lee	N/A
7	"Trap Door pt 2 of 2"	Stan Lee and Bryce Zabel	Stan Lee	N/A
8	"Dark Light pt 1 of 2"	Stan Lee and Bryce Zabel	Stan Lee	N/A
9	"Dark Light pt 2 of 2"	Stan Lee and Bryce Zabel	Stan Lee	N/A
10	"Bloodzone"	Stan Lee and Bryce Zabel	Stan Lee	N/A
11	"Desperate Measures"	Will Meugniot and David Ransil	Stan Lee	N/A
12	"Powers That Be"	Will Meugniot and Andy Baker	Stan Lee	N/A
13	"End Game"	Will Meugniot and Brian Davidson	Stan Lee	N/A
14	"Fall Of Izaus"	Will Meugniot and Andy Baker	Stan Lee	N/A
15	"One Krog Too Many"	Will Meugniot and David Ransil	Stan Lee	N/A
16	"Dangerous Alchemy"	Will Meugniot and Andy Baker	Stan Lee	N/A
17	"Trapped"	Will Meugniot and Andy Baker	Stan Lee	N/A
18	"Whipsaws Curse"	Mark Evanier and Andy Baker	Stan Lee	N/A
19	"Depths Of Memory"	Mark Evanier, Andy Baker and David Ransil	Stan Lee	N/A
20	"Back In The Game"	Mark Evanier, Andy Baker and David Ransil	Stan Lee	N/A
21	"Heroes Once More"	N/A	Stan Lee	N/A
22	"Game Over"	Stan Lee and Will Meugniot	Stan Lee	N/A

== Production ==
In August 1999, it was reported that Stan Lee Media would debut web series The 7th Portal online in October of that year which would feature 14 original superheroes and supervillains created and designed by Stan Lee with new video installments debuting every two weeks. According to Lee, his inspiration came from his fascination with the emergence of the Internet which in turn led to Lee's creation of a superhero universe wherein a group of beta testers would go on adventures in Cyberspace. Duncan Rouleau was initially announced as the artist who would collaborate with Lee on the project, however, Shawn McManus ended up drawing the artwork for The 7th Portal, with each webisode taking a little over a month to animate. Warner Bros. Online, a joint venture between Warner Bros. and FortuneCity to compete with GeoCities, Tripod, and Go Network, partnered with Stan Lee Media to offer visitors to its site 20 megabytes of free personal Web space, including e-mail, chat and message board services via Warner Bros. homepage AcmeCity. In February 2000, Stephen L. Brain, founder of Fox Animation Studios, joined Stan Lee Media as executive Vice President of production and would oversee digital animation studio's development slate original comic books and animated weekly series for the internet included 7th Portal with an intended launch date of February 29, 2000 and new episodes released every two weeks thereafter. Jon Corfino, head of Stan Lee Media's theme park and location-based attractions division and designer of Universal Studios attractions E.T. Adventure and Back to the Future: The Ride, worked with Iwerks Entertainment and partnered with Paramount Parks to produce motion simulator attraction, Stan Lee’s 7th Portal 3-D Simulation Experience animated by Blur Studio. In June 2000, it was reported that producer Mark Canton had entered into a seven figure deal with Stan Lee Media to adapt The 7th Portal into a big budget feature film. Lee stated that one of his goals with Stan Lee Media was to showcase the internet as a tool to create superhero franchises for adaptation to traditional media. In December 2000, Stan Lee Media ceased operations due to cash flow problems exacerbated by the dot-com crash leaving the future of The 7th Portal including the feature adaptation in doubt.

== Facts ==
- The 7th Portal became the first ever web animation series to succeed as a 3D ride attraction and to be developed for a $150 million movie by Paramount Pictures with producer Mark Canton.
- The first public use of the word Webisode has been attributed to the marketing and promotion of The 7th Portal. It is a portmanteau formed by the words 'web' and 'episode'.

== Awards ==
- In November 2000, The 7th Portal won the Best of Show Web Award for "Best Entertainment Portal".

== See also ==
- The Accuser
- The Backstreet Project
- The Drifter
- List of animated Internet series
