= Peter F. Paul =

American former lawyer and entrepreneur (born 1948)

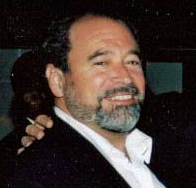
- Paul in 2000
- Born: Peter Franklin Paul; September 2, 1948 (age 77); United States
- Occupations: Lawyer, entrepreneur
- Known for: Stan Lee Media: managing Fabio Lanzoni

Peter Franklin Paul (born September 2, 1948) is an American former lawyer and entrepreneur who was convicted for conspiracy and drug dealing, and later for securities fraud in connection with his business dealings with Spider-Man co-creator Stan Lee.

He has repeatedly brought suit against Hillary Clinton, accusing her of lying about donations he solicited on behalf of her 2000 senatorial campaign.

In the 1990s, Paul managed Italian model, actor, and author Fabio Lanzoni.

== The Cuban coffee caper ==
In the 1970s, Peter Paul served as President of the Miami World Trade Center. As a result of what Paul described as anti-Communist and anti-Castro political activities, he directed a fraud on the Cuban government of $8.75 million by selling agents of Cuban president Fidel Castro nonexistent coffee. The plan apparently also involved sinking the ship that was to deliver the nonexistent coffee to hide the fraud from Castro and, according to Time magazine, to defraud its insurer, but the conspirators neglected to bribe a port official in Santo Domingo, and the people who were supposed to scuttle the boat were not allowed on board.

Paul pleaded guilty to federal conspiracy charges. When his home was raided by the police in connection with this crime, they found cocaine in his garage, and Paul also pleaded guilty to possessing cocaine with intent to distribute. He was sentenced to eight years in prison for the cocaine charge, and a concurrent three years for fraud; he was paroled after three years. His license to practice law was suspended as a result of the convictions, and he claims to have been sued by the Cuban government as well.

In 1983, Paul was caught traveling to Canada using the identity of a dead man; he pleaded guilty to federal charges of making false statements to customs inspectors. This was a violation of his parole terms from the 1979 felonies, and he went back to prison.

== Involvement in politics and the entertainment industry ==
After being released from federal prison in California, Paul moved to Los Angeles.

In 1985, Paul was appointed President of the California Bicentennial Foundation for the Constitution and Bill of Rights, a foundation designated by the California state legislature and governor to direct California's role in the Bicentennial celebration of the Constitution and Bill of Rights.

In 1987, Paul's efforts on behalf of the Foundation were derided in the Los Angeles Times, in part because the commission was selling a book that described blacks using the slur "pickaninnies", and declared enslavers "the worst victims of slavery", and in part because Paul referred to the founding fathers of the United States as "39 sweaty old men arguing in Philadelphia", and his remark that most Californians weren't able to understand the 18th-century language in the constitution anyway.

In 1988, Chief Justice Warren Burger had commended Paul for his efforts in a letter that read in part, "We commend you for the many contributions you have made during the national commemoration of the Constitution's 200th anniversary."

Paul became a business manager for, or otherwise involved with several celebrities, including becoming manager for a time of romance-novel icon Fabio.

=== Hillary Clinton's senatorial campaign ===
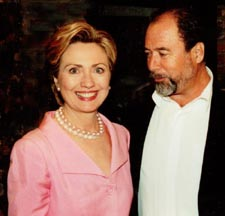
Hillary Rodham Clinton (left) and Paul (right) in 2000.

Paul emerged in 2000 as the largest contributor to Senatorial candidate Hillary Clinton. Paul and his attorneys have at various times offered two explanations for this. First, that he was trying to attract her husband, then-President Bill Clinton, to serve on the board of Stan Lee Media after leaving office. Second, that he hoped to negotiate a pardon for his previous criminal convictions. Paul produced the event in Los Angeles, days before the 2000 Democratic Convention began. The Hollywood Farewell Gala Salute to President William Jefferson Clinton featured prominent entertainers singing for the President, while raising over $1 million for Hillary Clinton's Senate campaign. The event cost $1.9 million to organize according to Paul and $500,000 according to the Federal Election Commission filing, much of it borrowed fraudulently by Paul from Merrill Lynch. Later indictments would state that Merrill Lynch lost about $5 million it had lent to Paul.

Two days after the gala, the Washington Post publicized Paul's criminal record, and Hillary Clinton denied knowing Paul and "vowed not to take any contributions from him". Through her spokesman, Howard Wolfson, Hillary stated on August 16, 2000, that she would return $2,000 she reported receiving from Paul in June 2000.

Paul alleged that Clinton was deceitful in this, and retained public interest law firm, and frequent Clinton opponent, Judicial Watch to represent him in a series of civil and criminal lawsuits against the Clintons, the Clinton campaign, and ultimately the Federal Election Commission (which he charged was negligent in failing to convict Mrs. Clinton). These charges were delayed, as courts held that Paul could not bring charges against the Clintons as he fought extradition from Brazil (to which he had fled in 2001 to escape Stan-Lee-Media-related criminal charges, see below), but proceeded once he was returned to the States.

In March 2005, Paul had a falling out with his advocates at Judicial Watch. He accused them of using his name to raise more than $15 million from people who disliked the Clintons, while doing little to advance his case. He announced his plan to replace them with a "dream team" of Republican lawyers, and in February 2007, he filed suit against them, saying that they had taken advantage of him and that he was "not a big fan of their behavior".

Regardless, Paul's claims have not found traction. An audit by the Federal Elections Commission found that neither Senator Clinton nor her Senate campaign had accepted any illegal funds in connection with the Hollywood fundraiser, though the campaign was asked to pay $35,000 in fines for having under-reported the cost of the party. Paul's suit against the FEC was thrown out; his attempt to bring ethics charges against Clinton was rejected, and his fraud charges against Senator Clinton were tossed out in April 2006. Paul continued to press civil charges against Senator Clinton and former President Clinton for "looting" his business, but the courts refused to allow him to sue Senator Clinton, with the appellate court specifying that her behavior had been "perfectly legal", and allowing her to recoup her legal fees from Paul. His charges against former President Clinton were tossed by Superior Court Judge Aurelio Munoz in December 2008, who ruled that Paul had waited too long to bring his claims.

Finding no luck in the courts, in 2007 Paul promoted a thirteen and a half minute video titled "Hillary Exposed: The Case of Paul v. Clinton," seeking to expose Senator Clinton. Her office responded "Peter Paul is a professional liar who has four separate criminal convictions, two for fraud. His video repackages a series of seven-year-old false claims about Senator Clinton that have already been rejected by the California state courts, the Justice Department, the Federal Election Commission, and the Senate Ethics Committee."

In January 2008, he re-filed his complaint with the FEC., seeking $41.9 million in damages.

== Involvement with Fabio ==
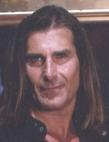
Fabio Lanzoni, who was managed by Paul during the 1990s

Peter F. Paul was the manager of Italian model, actor, and author Fabio Lanzoni, helping him achieve international recognition.

When they began working together, Paul "suggested building Fabio's career around [Fabio's] philosophy," packaging products that incorporate his romantic approach to health and fitness. In 1993, Lanzoni was working 17 to 18 hours a day, claiming he could count the number of days he had off that year.

In 1993, he published Fabio's biography, Fabio. It contains over 100 photographs, presumably of Fabio. Lanzoni included Paul in the dedication to his 1995 book Fabio Fitness, though Paul was terminated shortly thereafter.

== Involvement with Stan Lee ==
=== Founding of Stan Lee Media, fraud, and flight ===
In 1998, Paul co-founded Stan Lee Media with comic book legend Stan Lee and took the company public via a reverse-merger into a trading shell in August 1999.

In February 2000, in the midst of the Internet stock market boom, Stan Lee Media built a 165-person studio. However, at the end of the year, Stan Lee Media ran out of money. Paul alleged in a later civil fraud and coercion suit against Bill and Hillary Clinton that the company failed because of the intervention of Bill Clinton, who he claims persuaded a large investor not to further support the company.

In the aftermath of the company's collapse, it was alleged that Paul and a corporate officer named Stephan Gordon had illegally tried to support the stock's price by using nominee accounts to buy 1.6 million shares of the company's stock, attempting to pay for the stock with bad checks.

In February 2001, Stan Lee Media filed for bankruptcy, and Peter Paul fled to São Paulo, Brazil. There he managed 112 Interactive do Brazil, a seller of English language acquisition software, and fought extradition.

=== Stan Lee-related litigation ===
Paul has promoted lawsuits against Marvel Entertainment claiming that Stan Lee Media owns the rights to all the Marvel characters created by Stan Lee. These would include Spider-Man and The X-Men. Paul and his associates further claim that Stan Lee Media was never properly dissolved as a corporation, and that they control the company. Though courts have found that some Stan Lee Media characters were improperly transferred to Stan Lee's later company, Pow Entertainment, plaintiffs have not yet found traction with these broader claims, and Stan Lee himself has both publicly dismissed these claims and has engaged in a series of cross-suits with Stan Lee Media, Peter Paul, and his associates.

On March 3, 2008, Paul posted a message to his blog, subsequently reposted by one or more unknown parties verbatim on other websites, in which he claimed that Stan Lee helped disguise the origin of Paul's unreported donations to Hillary Clinton, and that he (Paul) has a video tape of Lee admitting to this subterfuge. Lee responded with a lawsuit against Paul, claiming defamation.

=== Securities fraud conviction and jail terms ===
On June 12, 2001, Paul was indicted on one count of violating SEC Reg. 10(b)5, for manipulating the price of the stock in Stan Lee Media. On August 3, 2001, Paul was arrested in Brazil and jailed, pending the outcome of extradition proceedings. Paul failed in his efforts to avoid extradition and, in September 2003, he was delivered to the Metropolitan Detention Facility in Brooklyn, New York, for arraignment and trial.

In August 2004, the SEC formally filed its complaint against Paul for the manipulation of Stan Lee Media's stock in violation of the antifraud provisions of Section 17(a) of the Securities Act of 1933, Section 10(b) of the Securities Exchange Act, and SEC Rule 10b-5. Paul pleaded guilty to the securities fraud charge. The government characterized his conduct as causing "losses to the investing public and financial institutions of approximately $25 million". In July 2005, he settled related civil charges, consenting to a permanent injunction against ever serving as an officer or director of any reporting company. He pleaded poverty and, as a result, was not asked to pay any fine. He then spent four years under house arrest, wearing an "ankle bracelet".

In July 2009, Paul accepted a plea bargain and was sentenced to ten years in prison, and ordered to pay over $11 million in restitution to Merrill Lynch and Spear, Leeds & Kellogg. He self-surrendered on September 30, 2009, but subsequently tried to have the plea bargain annulled, claiming that the judge coerced him into agreeing to the deal. In March 2011, the courts rejected this attempt, and Paul continued to serve his 10-year imprisonment term as inmate number 78802-012. He was imprisoned at the Federal Correctional Institution, La Tuna in Anthony, Texas, until he was paroled on December 24, 2014.

== See also ==
- Hollywood fundraiser controversy
- Paul v. Clinton
