= Paul v. Clinton =

2001 American civil case

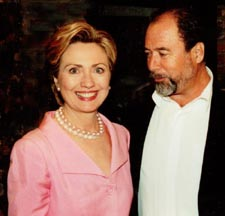
Hillary Clinton and Peter Paul at the Gala Hollywood Farewell Salute to President Clinton.

Paul v. Clinton was a civil lawsuit filed by Peter F. Paul, the plaintiff, against the defendants, former President Bill Clinton, and his wife, former First Lady Hillary Clinton. The Clintons were accused of alleged swindling of Paul's money and interference in his business dealings on June 19, 2001, in Los Angeles. James Levin, a Democratic Party fundraiser close to the Mr. Clinton and a Chicago business man, as well as two producers of the star-studded fundraiser, Gala Hollywood Farewell Salute to President Clinton, Aaron Tonken, a protege of Paul, and Gary Smith, were also named defendants in the suit. Paul alleged that he spent more than $1.9 million of his own personal funds to organize and sponsor the event held on August 12, 2000. The fundraiser was held on the eve of the Democratic National Convention, during Hillary Clinton's first Senate race. The fundraiser attracted many stars, such as Cher, Brad Pitt, John Travolta, Diana Ross, Muhammad Ali and many others. He claimed that the reason he financed the fundraiser and other events for Hillary Clinton was that her husband allegedly agreed to join the board of the company Paul co-founded with Stan Lee, Stan Lee Media, after he left the Oval Office in January 2001. However, Paul said that these promises were never fulfilled. Although he contended the event cost close to $2 million, the campaign reports filed with the Federal Election Commission at the time estimated at $500,000.

== Background ==
Peter Paul helped organize the Gala Hollywood Farewell Salute to President Clinton fundraiser for the Democratic Party and Hillary Clinton's 2000 New York Senate campaign, which raised more than $1 million for her campaign. In addition to Paul's promise to help with her campaign, court filings state that in return for working for one year at Stan Lee Media, he offered Mr. Clinton $10 million in SLM stock, $5 million in cash and $1 million for the Clinton Library. Two days after the dinner and concert, a columnist at the Washington Post, Lloyd Grove, reported about Paul's felony record, revealing that he had three separate criminal convictions on fraud and drug charges from the 1970s and 1980s at the time. In the late 1970s, Paul was convicted of cocaine possession with intentions to distribute and of attempting to defraud Fidel Castro's Cuban Government of $8.75 million by selling it a non-existent shipload of coffee beans. Paul was sentenced to approximately 40 months in prison. In the 1980s, he violated his terms of parole by lying to a Customs officer, which resulted in him serving time again. When Paul was arrested for all of these crimes, he claimed that he was part of a secret government operation. Since Howard Wolfson, Hillary Clinton's spokesperson, said that her campaign would not accept any contributions from Paul, they returned the $2000 check they directly received from him and his wife, but ignored Paul's alleged $1.9 million contribution.

Following the collapse and declaration of bankruptcy of Stan Lee Media in early February 2001, Paul departed for Brazil to avoid prosecution of stock fraud charges, more specifically he manipulated the price of the Stan Lee Media's stock price. He was indicted with criminal charges and spent more than two years in a Brazilian prison, before being extradited back to the United States.

== 2005-2009 ==
=== The Gala Hollywood Farewell Salute to President Clinton ===
In late 2005, one of Hillary Clinton's fundraising committees agreed to pay a $35,000 fine for underreporting gifts spent on the Hollywood gala by $721,895 to boost her campaign for the Senate. Even though the committee had corrected its filings, Paul continuously said that the campaign was still refusing to acknowledge his alleged near $2 million contribution.

=== Senator Clinton Dropped from Lawsuit ===
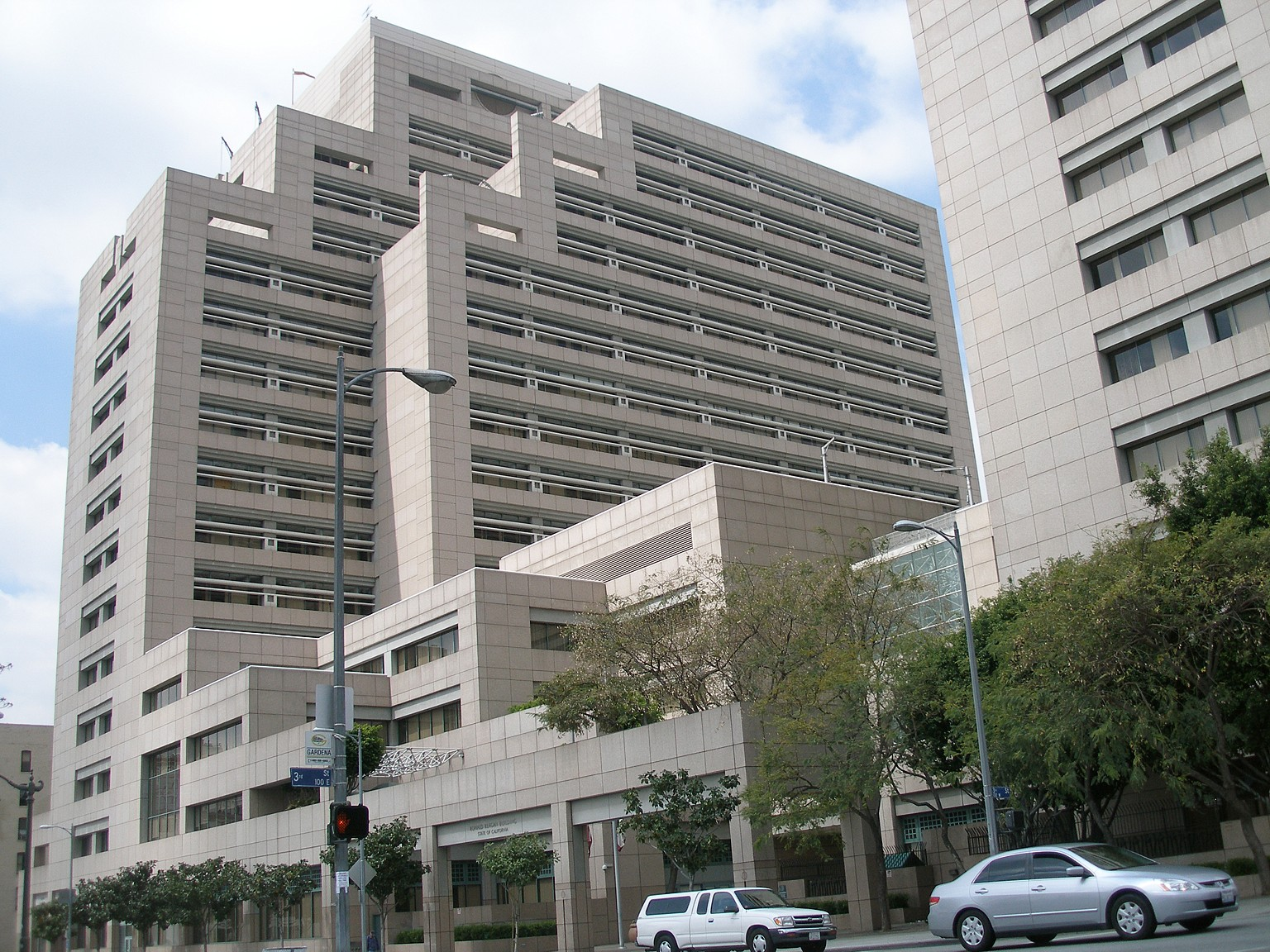
California's Second District Court of Appeal

On April 10, 2006, at the Los Angeles County Superior Court, Judge Aurelio Munoz dismissed Senator Hillary Clinton as the defendant in the Paul v. Clinton lawsuit. Judge Munoz Brough criticized Peter Paul's legal team for "inundat[ing] this court" with photos of Paul with the Clintons, President Ronald Reagan and his wife, Nancy, and others, which provided no evidence that the Clintons made any promises to him. The judge stated, "there is nothing to indicate Hillary Clinton was aware that the promises were not made in good faith." She sought out dismissal under a California law aimed at reducing lawsuits and protecting people's First Amendment rights. Before Hillary was dismissed, the attorneys representing Paul, the United States Justice Foundation, asked that they have permission to take her deposition, but Judge Munoz declined. Although Senator Clinton was dismissed from the case, the lawsuit continued with Bill Clinton, James Levin, Aaron Tonken and Gary Smith as defendants, and their trial date was set for March 27, 2007.

Later, Peter Paul then filed an appeal of the decision. Two hearings were held on September 7, 2007, and October 16, 2007, where California's Second District Court of Appeal denied the motion to reinstate Senator Hillary Clinton as the defendant in the lawsuit that claims she, her husband and other associates swindled money from Paul to fund the 2000 fundraising event. The appellate court upheld the lower court's, Los Angeles County Superior Court, decision to remove the New York senator and Democratic presidential candidate, while it also said that Clinton would be able to regain her legal costs. After the ruling, Paul said he would consider a further appeal to the Supreme Court of California. Most, but not all of the causes of action against President Clinton had been dismissed on procedural grounds. Paul's attorneys, mainly Colette Wilson, pleaded that Clinton violated federal code, which would in turn make her not covered the anti-SLAPP statute. A lawyer of Paul, Lucianne Goldberg, then released a video claiming that Clinton was aware of Paul's illegal campaign activities. However, the evidence he provided did not make his statement clear at all. It only showed Hillary Clinton thanking the fundraiser organizers, without proving anything on Clinton's knowledge of Paul's alleged actions.

In early March 2005, Paul pleaded guilty to one felony of stock fraud. Four years later on June 25, 2009, Judge Leonard Wexler sentenced him to ten years in prison. This was said to have pretty much been the end to the story, mainly because the Washington Post had then become aware that Peter Paul was a three-time convicted felon, making his appeals less interesting. As of early 2009, Hillary and Bill Clinton have both been dismissed from the case, Paul v. Clinton, as defendants, and she won an award of $130,000 in legal fees against Paul. The civil suit was still on-going against Gary Smith, a producer of the 2000 fundraiser.

== Bibliography ==
- Cieply, Michael and Bates, James. "Money, Politics and the Undoing of Stan Lee Media." The Los Angeles Times, July 20, 2003. https://www.latimes.com/archives/la-xpm-2003-jul-20-fi-stanlee20-story.html.
- Gerstein, Josh. "Judge Drops Senator Clinton From Lawsuit." The New York Sun, April 10, 2006. https://www.nysun.com/national/judge-drops-senator-clinton-from-lawsuit/30698/.
- Gerstein, Josh. "After 4 years, Clintons' accuser sentenced to 10." Politico, July 22, 2009. https://www.politico.com/blogs/under-the-radar/2009/07/after-4-years-clintons-accuser-sentenced-to-10-020086.
- Novak, Robert D. "A Clinton Donor With a Bone to Pick." The Washington Post, June 28, 2001. https://www.washingtonpost.com/archive/opinions/2001/06/28/a-clinton-donor-with-a-bone-to-pick/ed3dbe79-5832-4468-9d85-fae3e1200e20/
- Novak, Viveca. "Crooked Claims About Clinton." Factcheck.org. January 18, 2008. https://www.factcheck.org/2008/01/crooked-claims-about-clinton/.
- Risling, Greg. "Court says Clinton Should Not Be in Suit." ABC News, October 16, 2007. https://web.archive.org/web/20080321124348/https://abcnews.go.com/Politics/wireStory?id=3738672.
- Rosenzweig, David. "Clash Over Clinton Gala Told." The Los Angeles Times, May 20, 2005. https://www.latimes.com/archives/la-xpm-2005-may-20-me-rosen20-story.html.
- The Washington Post. "Clinton Fundraisers Are Fined $35,000." January 6, 2006. https://www.washingtonpost.com/wp-dyn/content/article/2006/01/05/AR2006010502382.html.
