= 2000 United States Senate election in New York =

- November 7, 2000
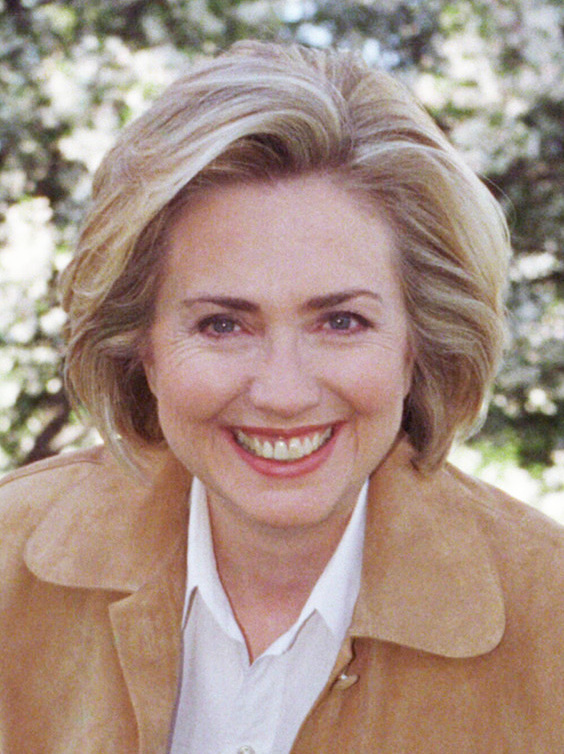

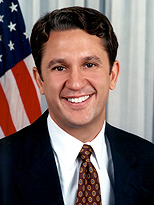
| Nominee | Hillary Rodham Clinton | Rick Lazio |
| Party | Democratic | Republican |
| Alliance | Parties: Liberal; Working Families | Conservative |
| Popular vote | 3,747,310 | 2,915,730 |
| Percentage | 55.27% | 43.01% |
- County results Clinton: 40–50% 50–60% 60–70% 70–80% 80–90% Lazio: 40–50% 50–60% 60–70%
U.S. senator before election
Daniel Patrick Moynihan
Democratic
Elected U.S. Senator
Hillary Rodham Clinton
Democratic

In the United States Senate election held in the State of New York on November 7, 2000, Hillary Rodham Clinton, then first lady of the United States and the first presidential spouse to run for political office, defeated U.S. representative Rick Lazio. The general election coincided with the U.S. presidential election.

The race began in November 1998 when four-term incumbent senator Daniel Patrick Moynihan announced his retirement, making this the first open Senate seat in New York since the 1958 Senate election. Both the Democratic Party and Republican Party sought high-profile candidates to compete for the open seat. By early 1999, Clinton and New York City mayor Rudy Giuliani were the frontrunners for their parties' respective nominations. Clinton and her husband, President Bill Clinton, purchased a house in Chappaqua, New York, in September 1999; she thereby became eligible for the election, although she faced accusations of carpetbagging since she had never resided in the state before. The lead in statewide polls swung from Clinton to Giuliani and back to Clinton as the campaigns featured both successful strategies and mistakes as well as dealing with current events.

In late April and May 2000, Giuliani's medical, romantic, marital, and political lives all collided in a tumultuous four-week period, culminating in his withdrawal from the race on May 19. The Republicans chose lesser-known U.S. representative Rick Lazio to replace him. The election included a record $90 million in campaign expenditures between Clinton, Lazio, and Giuliani and national visibility. Clinton showed strength in normally Republican upstate areas and a debate blunder by Lazio solidified Clinton's previously shaky support among women. Clinton won the election in November 2000 with 55 percent of the vote to Lazio's 43 percent, and became the first woman elected to the Senate from New York.

== Background ==
When four-term senator Daniel Patrick Moynihan announced his retirement in November 1998, his previously safe U.S. Senate seat became open in the 2000 U.S. Senate elections. Both parties tried to find high-profile candidates to run for it.

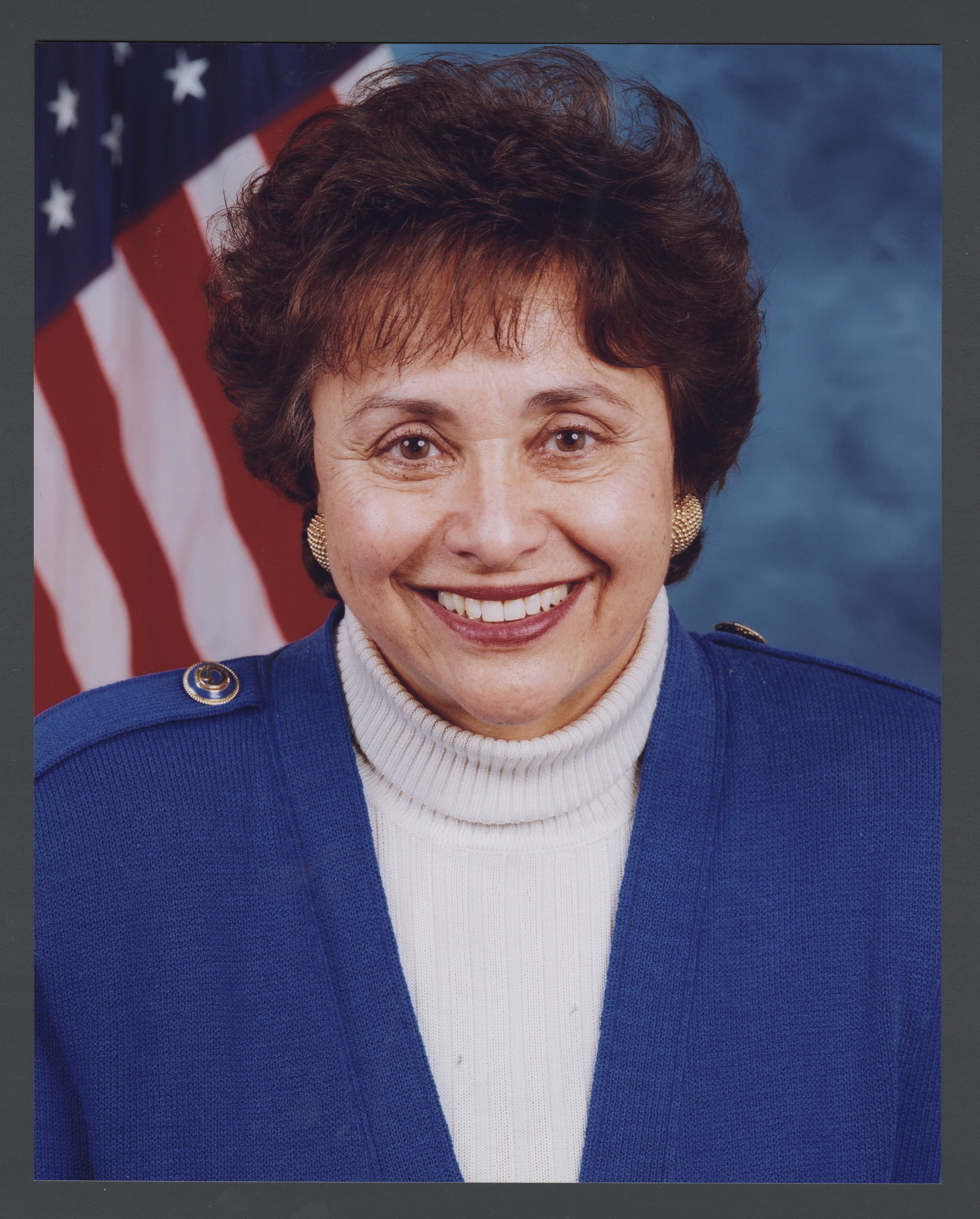
U.S. representative Nita Lowey was initially expected to run, but she stepped aside in favor of First Lady Hillary Rodham Clinton.

New York City mayor Rudy Giuliani, who was prevented by term limits from running for mayoral reelection in 2001, immediately indicated interest. Due to his high profile and visibility, Giuliani was supported by the New York State Republican Party, even though he had irritated many by endorsing incumbent Democratic governor Mario Cuomo over Republican George Pataki in 1994. Giuliani became the presumptive Republican nominee, and by April 1999 had formed a formal exploratory committee for a Senate run. There were still possible Republican primary opponents. Rick Lazio, a U.S. representative representing Suffolk County on Long Island, was raising money and had a candidacy announcement scheduled for August 16; he had openly discussed a primary against Giuliani, believing his more conservative record would be appealing to Republican primary voters. In early August, under pressure from state and national Republican figures, Pataki endorsed Giuliani. Pataki prevailed upon Lazio to forgo his candidacy, which Lazio agreed to despite frustration that Giuliani had still not officially announced that he was running; Lazio said, "If the mayor wants to be a candidate, I think he needs to get into this race. It is time to put the soap opera aside and step up to the plate." Nassau County U.S. representative Peter T. King also considered running and had raised some funds.

U.S. representative Nita Lowey was the candidate first expected to be the Democratic nominee, while other mentioned possible candidates included secretary of housing and urban development Andrew Cuomo, state comptroller Carl McCall, as well as U.S. representative Carolyn Maloney. State Democratic figures were concerned that neither Lowey nor the others had the star power to rival Giuliani, and that the seat would be lost. Late in 1998, prominent Democratic politicians and advisors, including U.S. representative Charles Rangel, urged First Lady Hillary Rodham Clinton to run for the U.S. Senate seat. An unprecedented action if she did it, Clinton spent considerable time mulling over the idea while Lowey waited in the wings. Her political advisors told her the race would be difficult and some of them told her she would lose. She waited for the impeachment proceedings of Bill Clinton to conclude, which they did with his acquittal on February 12, 1999.

== Initial campaigns ==
=== Early Clinton campaign ===
On February 16, 1999, the First Lady's office announced that she was considering running for the Senate seat. Once it was clear Clinton was going to run, Lowey stepped aside, although she would be disappointed at the lost opportunity. Clinton’s political adviser, Harold Ickes, lead the campaign during its early stages. Ickes assembled the initial campaign team, which included Terry McAuliffe and Laura Hartigan. Both had previously been the most senior members of Bill Clinton's finance team during his 1996 reelection campaign. In December 1999, after a series of campaign missteps, Bill de Blasio was brought on as the full-time campaign manager.

On July 7, 1999, Clinton formally announced an exploratory committee for the Senate run; the setting was Moynihan's farm in Pindars Corners, in rural Delaware County. Bill Clinton was less than enthusiastic about her candidacy. The staging of the event was brokered by the Clintons' political consultant Mandy Grunwald. Hillary Clinton embarked upon a "listening tour" of all parts of New York after her entrance into the race. She planned to visit all 62 counties in New York, talking to New Yorkers in small-group settings according to the principles of retail politics. During the race, she spent considerable time campaigning in traditionally Republican upstate regions. Clinton faced charges of carpetbagging, since she had never resided in the State of New York nor directly participated in state politics prior to her Senate race.

Meanwhile, in September 1999, the Clintons purchased a $1.7 million, 11-room, Dutch Colonial style home in Chappaqua, New York, north of New York City. Even the commonplace activity of house hunting leading up to this was the subject of considerable media attention; coverage of personal lives would be the norm in this contest of two "electrifying and polarizing figures" (as one reporter put it). In November 1999, Hillary Clinton announced that she would set aside most of her official duties as First Lady in order to take up residency in New York and pursue her campaign. Her move-in took place in January 2000, with the house furnished with many of the couple's possessions from their Arkansas days. It became the first time since Woodrow Wilson's first wife died in 1914 that a president lived in the White House without a spouse.

The early stages of her campaign were not without mistakes, and as she later wrote, "Mistakes in New York politics aren't easily brushed aside." In a much-publicized move, Clinton donned a New York Yankees baseball cap at a June 1999 event when she had been a lifelong fan of the Chicago Cubs. This brought her much criticism, and Thomas Kuiper would later write an anti-Clinton book titled: I've Always Been a Yankees Fan: Hillary Clinton in Her Own Words. Clinton said she had to develop an American League rooting interest, since fans of the Cubs were not expected to root for the American League Chicago White Sox. In her 2003 autobiography, she said that putting on the hat had been a "bad move", but reiterated what had been reported in the press prior to the incident, that she had been "a die-hard Mickey Mantle fan;" the book included a photograph of her with a Yankees cap on from 1992.

More seriously, on November 11, 1999, at the dedication of a U.S.-funded health program in the West Bank, she exchanged kisses with Suha Arafat, wife of Palestinian president Yasser Arafat, after Suha Arafat had delivered a speech claiming that Israel had deliberately poisoned Palestinians through environmental degradation and the use of "poisonous gas". Some Israeli supporters said that Clinton never should have kissed the wife of the Palestinian leader, especially after such inflammatory remarks. The following day, Clinton denounced Suha Arafat's allegations, and said that Palestinian negotiator Saeb Erekat had told her Suha Arafat had been referring to 'tear gas' and not 'poison gas'. The kiss became a campaign issue, especially with Jewish voters. Clinton said it was a formality akin to a handshake, saying that to not have done so would have caused a diplomatic incident. Clinton later wrote that the live Arabic-to-English translation had failed to convey the accurate nature of her remarks: "Had I been aware of her hateful words, I would have denounced them on the spot."

Clinton faced an erosion of support from women voters during her campaign, with her numbers declining throughout 1999. This was partly a typical pattern seen with women candidates where they have an early surge of female support, which then wears off, and it was partly due to her early campaign stumbles. But it also reflected the particular set of mixed feelings that women had towards Clinton's marriage and the ambition and the power she derived from it. The problem was especially acute among some female demographics; one of her longtime advisers later said, "Women in the educated professional class? They fucking couldn't stand her. We could never figure out why. We had psychologists come in."

Clinton's campaign to all counties, carried by a Ford conversion van, helped to defuse the carpetbagger issue, with many New York residents saying that Clinton "seems like one of us." She discussed local issues such as price supports for the dairy industry, fares for air travel, college tuition levels, and the brain drain in parts of the state. Her political positions were well matched to the different constituencies in the state that she targeted. In a January 2000 appearance on the Late Show with David Letterman, she established a rapport with the host that would continue throughout her Senate years and into her 2008 presidential campaign. Clinton formally announced her official candidacy in Purchase, New York in February 2000, adopting the simple name "Hillary" for her campaign literature.

Distrustful of the press since her husband's 1992 presidential campaign and her early days as First Lady, she imposed limits on her availability to the press van following her. Associated Press reporter Beth Harpaz later recounted a typical day from this time: "But we'd been told there'd be no 'avail' today, and we'd accepted it. That didn't prevent me from feeling slightly humiliated. I was so worn down and so exasperated by the lack of access and the lack of news in this campaign that I'd given up fighting."

=== Early Giuliani campaign ===
An early January 1999 Marist Institute of Public Opinion poll showed Giuliani trailing Clinton by 10 points. By January 2000, the Marist poll showed Giuliani up by 9 points. Giuliani's tactics involved intentionally baiting the Clinton campaign with deliberate overstatements, keeping them off balance and behind in the response cycle. Giuliani emphasized his depiction of Clinton as a carpetbagger. He made a one-day visit to Little Rock, Arkansas, where he announced he would fly the Arkansas state flag over New York's City Hall. When Hillary Clinton visited New York from Washington, he said, "I hope she knows the way. I hope she doesn't get lost on one of the side streets." Giuliani's campaign prepared a 315-page opposition research dossier that went back to her time at Wellesley College; it included eleven pages of what they termed "Stupid Actions and Remarks". The Giuliani campaign had no problems raising money, getting over 40 percent of its funds from out-of-state and outraising Clinton overall two-to-one.

The Giuliani campaign showed some structural weaknesses. So closely identified with New York City, he had somewhat limited appeal to naturally Republican voters in Upstate New York. The Farmersville Garbage Scandal was indicative of his lower levels of support upstate. By late December 1999, Clinton adapted to Giuliani's psychological warfare, saying in response to one such gambit, "I can't be responding every time the mayor gets angry. Because that's all I would do." A February 2000 attempt by Giuliani to capitalize on a Clinton campaign event's accidental playing of Billy Joel's suburban drug tale "Captain Jack" led to more ridicule for him than for her.

On March 11, 2000, Giuliani and Clinton met face-to-face for the first time since the campaigning began, at the New York Inner Circle press dinner, an annual event in which New York politicians and the press corps stage skits, roast each other and make fun of themselves, with proceeds going to charity. Giuliani was on stage in male disco garb spoofing John Travolta in Saturday Night Fever, but also appeared in drag in taped video clips that reworked the "Rudy/Rudia" theme of a past Inner Circle dinner, as well as in an exchange with Joan Rivers that sought to make fun of Clinton. Other performers' skits made fun of Clinton's Yankees claim and the infidelity of her husband.

The New York Police Department's fatal shooting of Patrick Dorismond on March 15, 2000, inflamed Giuliani's already strained relations with the city's minority communities, and Clinton seized on it as a major campaign issue. By April, reports showed Clinton gaining upstate and generally outworking Giuliani, who stated that his duties as mayor prevented him from campaigning more. He gave priority to city duties over campaign activities. Some Giuliani aides and national Republican figures concluded that his interest in the campaign was flagging, as although he was desirous of winning in political combat against a Clinton, he was by nature an executive personality and the prospect of serving as one of a hundred legislators was unappealing to him.

By this time, Clinton was 8 to 10 points ahead of Giuliani in the polls. In retrospect, The New York Times would write that the battle so far between the two had comprised "a blistering year of mental gamesmanship, piercing attacks, contrasts in personalities and positions, and blunders played out by two outsize political figures in a super-heated atmosphere."

=== Giuliani's tumultuous four weeks ===
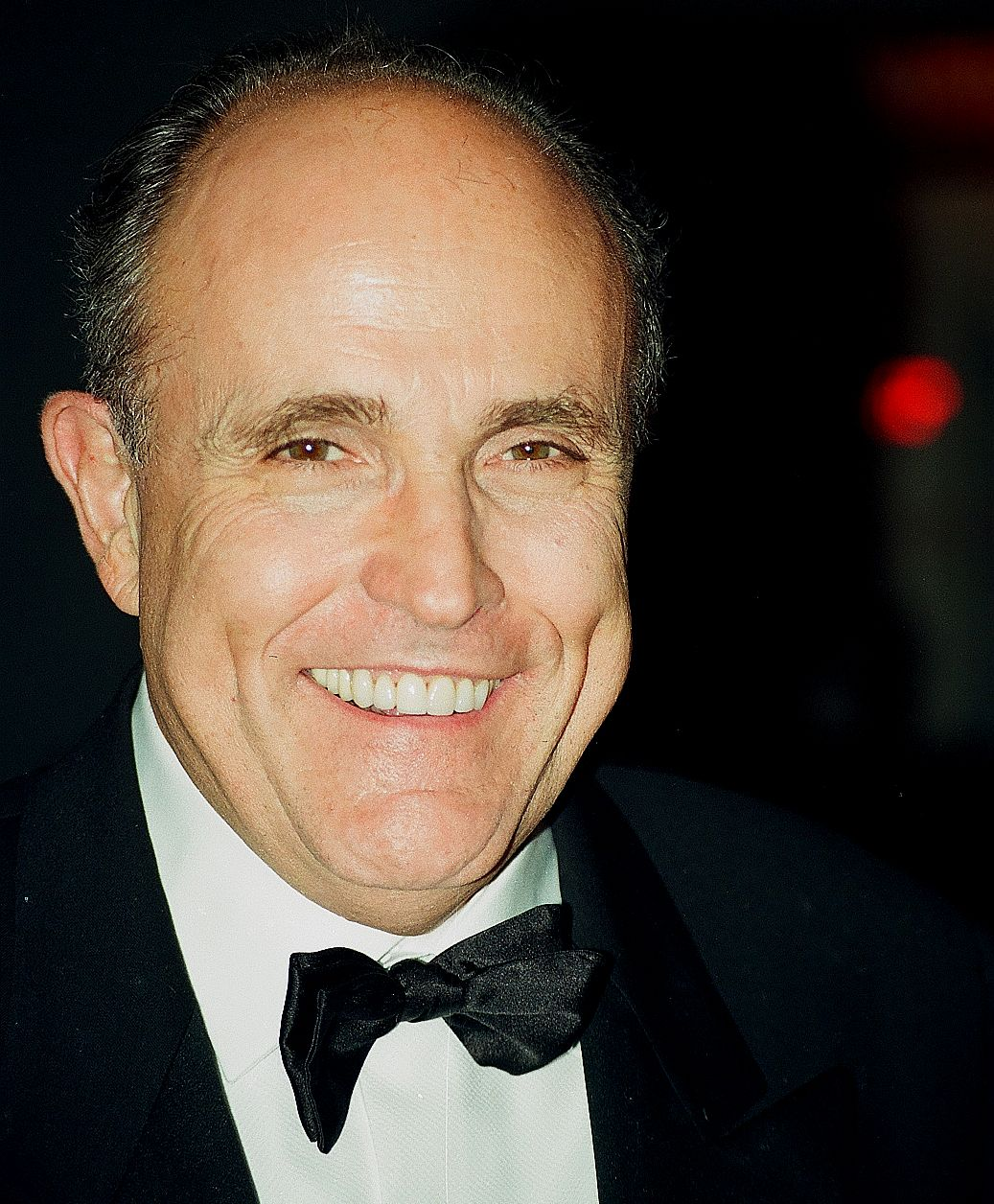
Rudy Giuliani was the presumptive Republican nominee for most of 1999 and 2000, until he abruptly withdrew on May 19, 2000, following a cancer diagnosis and the public collapse of his marriage to Donna Hanover.

Giuliani's marriage to his wife, broadcast journalist and actress Donna Hanover, had been distant since 1996, and the two were rarely seen in public together. There had been no formal announcement of any change in their relationship, although Hanover had indicated that she and their children would not move to Washington if Giuliani won the race. Beginning in October 1999, a new woman was being spotted at mayoral functions. By March 2000, Giuliani had stopped wearing his wedding ring and was being seen more in the company of this other woman, including at the Inner Circle press dinner, the St. Patrick's Day parade, and town hall meetings, but it was not yet fully clear whether the relationship was personal or professional. While this woman had become a frequent subject of insider talk among the New York political circle, she had not been mentioned in the press.

On April 20 Hanover announced that she would soon be taking over the lead role in Eve Ensler's controversial play The Vagina Monologues. Political observers speculated that Hanover was partly engaging in a political act against her husband, as Ensler was a friend and supporter of Hillary Clinton and the role would not go over well with social conservatives within the Republican Party. Giuliani declined to say whether he would attend one of her performances. On April 22, the New York Post obtained photographs of Giuliani openly strolling on a Manhattan street with the other woman after they left a restaurant, but did not have more than a first name for her; the Post sat on the story, but it was clear the relationship was a personal one.

On April 26, television channel NY1 reported that Giuliani had undergone a second round of tests for prostate cancer at Mount Sinai Medical Center; the same disease had led to the death of his father. On April 28, Giuliani held a news conference to announce that he did in fact have prostate cancer, but it was in an early stage. He was unsure of which of several types of treatment he might undergo, and that decision would impact whether he could stay in the Senate race or not. Hanover was not present at the conference, but issued a note saying she would support him in his decision process.

As Giuliani mulled over his medical options, on May 1 Hanover announced that she was postponing her appearance in The Vagina Monologues due to "personal family circumstances." On May 2 the New York Daily News published a brief item about Giuliani's other woman, without name or description. On May 3 the New York Post finally published its photographs of Giuliani and the woman, now identified as Judith Nathan, leaving a restaurant together, under the front-page headline "Rudy's Mystery Brunch Pal is Upper East Side Divorcée". (Some observers felt that Giuliani, known for his ability to manipulate the New York media, had been eager for news of the relationship to come out.) Later that day, Giuliani responded to a barrage of questions on the subject at a news conference by acknowledging Judith Nathan publicly for the first time, calling her "a very good friend" and expressing his annoyance that her privacy was being invaded. The next days were filled with New York media coverage on Nathan's background and on the relationship. On May 6 Hanover held an unusually-located news conference at the back of St. Patrick's Cathedral before the funeral of Cardinal John O'Connor; visibly trembling, she said, "I will be supportive of Rudy in his fight against his illness, as this marriage and this man have been very precious to me." The following day half the press tried to stake out Nathan's known locations while the rest pestered Nathan's hometown relatives in Hazleton, Pennsylvania; Giuliani looked weak in a public appearance.

On May 10, Giuliani held what The New York Times described as an "extraordinary, emotional news conference" in Bryant Park to announce that he was seeking a separation from Hanover, saying, "This is very, very painful. For quite some time it's probably been apparent that Donna and I lead in many ways independent and separate lives." Regarding Nathan, Giuliani said "I'm going to need her now more than maybe I did before", making reference to his battle with cancer and her background in nursing. Regarding the Senate race, he again did not commit to a decision, saying, "I don't really care about politics right now. I'm thinking about my family, the people that I love and what can be done that's honest and truthful and that protects them the best. I'm not thinking about politics. Politics comes at least second, maybe third, maybe fourth, somewhere else. It'll all work itself out some way politically." Giuliani had, however, neglected to inform Hanover in advance of his announcement; her reaction was described as distraught. Three hours later, she held her own news conference at Gracie Mansion, where she said, "Today's turn of events brings me great sadness. I had hoped to keep this marriage together. For several years, it was difficult to participate in Rudy's public life because of his relationship with one staff member." In this, she was making reference to Cristyne Lategano, the former communications director for Giuliani; Vanity Fair had reported in 1997 that Lategano and Giuliani were having an affair, which both of them had denied. Hanover continued, "Beginning last May, I made a major effort to bring us back together. Rudy and I re-established some of our personal intimacy through the fall. At that point, he chose another path."

State Republican leaders, who until now had avoided talk of replacements for Giuliani should he not run, now gave more attention to the matter, with the state party convention coming up on May 30. Former possible contenders Rick Lazio and Pete King immediately indicated they were available; other names mentioned included Wall Street financier Theodore J. Forstmann and Governor Pataki, although the latter indicated no interest. Giuliani continued to ponder his Senate race decision; when he had dinner with Nathan on May 12, they were trailed by a flock of photographers. Giuliani canceled campaigning and fundraising trips to upstate New York and California on May 13, suggesting he would not run, but then resumed fundraising and suggested he was inclined towards running on May 15. Two Republican county chairmen became upset at the indecision, saying, "Like Waiting for Godot, we have Waiting for Rudy", and, "We need a decision. Like tomorrow would be nice. Because this is getting ridiculous." A top state Republican said, "He seem[s] to like the attention. He seems to be going through some sort of catharsis in public. And we're like psychiatrists watching it. I can't quite figure it out. I don't think anybody can." Clinton, meanwhile, said as little as possible about the situation, preferring to let Giuliani's drama play out on its own; on May 17, as he huddled with his doctors over whether to choose surgery or radiation as his treatment while facing conflicting political advice from his aides, she won the unanimous approval of delegates to the Democratic Party state convention at the Pepsi Arena in Albany, giving a constrained acceptance speech because she did not know her general election opponent.

Finally, on May 19, Giuliani held what The New York Times again described as "an emotional, riveting news conference" that "reached a new level of introspection" to announce that he was dropping out of the Senate race: "This is not the right time for me to run for office. If it were six months ago or it were a year from now or the timing were a little different, maybe it would be different. But it isn't different and that's the way life is." He added that, "I used to think the core of me was in politics, probably. It isn't. When you feel your mortality and your humanity you realize that, that the core of you is first of all being able to take care of your health." He said that he would instead devote the remainder of his mayoralty trying to overcome the hostile relations he had with many of the city's minority groups.

=== A change of Republicans: Lazio ===
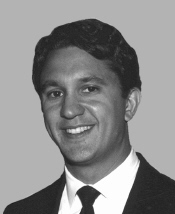
After Giuliani withdrew in May 2000, lesser-known Long Island congressman Rick Lazio took his place.

While previous Republican candidates and fellow Long Island congressmen Rick Lazio and Pete King had both indicated an interest in replacing Giuliani, upon Giuliani's withdrawal the state party quickly rallied around Lazio, who had more campaign funds and who was viewed as a potentially strong candidate. In particular, Governor Pataki — who never cared much for Giuliani to begin with — was strongly in favor of Lazio, and praised him as a "fresh, unencumbered challenger" to Clinton. This also caused a shuffle in New York's unique third-party ballot-line alignments: the Liberal Party of New York, which was previously set to run Giuliani (whom they had supported in all three of his mayoral races), now switched to Clinton, while the Conservative Party of New York, which had previously been loath to endorse the socially liberal Giuliani (and was set to nominate former Westchester congressman Joe DioGuardi) lined up behind Lazio. Lazio accepted the unanimous approval of delegates to the Republican Party state convention at a hotel ballroom in Buffalo on May 30.

Clinton now faced a lesser-known candidate in Lazio. While a relative moderate among House Republicans, Lazio had frequently supported former House speaker Newt Gingrich, a largely despised figure among many New Yorkers. Lazio did bring to the table a suburban background familiar to many New Yorkers, and had a reputation as an energetic campaigner.

One formality left were New York's late-in-the-season primary elections on September 12, which in this case merely served to ratify the state party conventions' choices. Lazio won unopposed, while Clinton won 82 percent of the vote in easily defeating unknown Manhattan doctor Mark McMahon, who ran on the grounds that "the Clintons have tried to hijack the Democratic Party." For her part, Clinton said that she was "surprised, in a way [to see her name in the voting booth]. I stood there for a minute, staring at my name." In any case, the general election was already well underway.

== Democratic primary ==
=== Candidates ===
- Hillary Rodham Clinton, first lady of the United States
- Mark McMahon

==== Declined ====
- Nita Lowey, U.S. representative from Harrison
- Daniel Patrick Moynihan, incumbent U.S. senator since 1977

=== Results ===
Democratic primary
| Party | Candidate | Votes | % |
|---|---|---|---|
| Democratic | Hillary Rodham Clinton | 565,353 | 81.97% |
| Democratic | Mark McMahon | 124,315 | 18.03% |
| Total votes | | 689,668 | 100.00% |

== Republican results ==
=== Candidates ===
- Rick Lazio, U.S. representative from Brightwaters

==== Withdrew ====
- Rudy Giuliani, mayor of New York City

==== Declined ====
- Al D'Amato, former U.S. senator from New York
- Theodore J. Forstmann, private equity executive
- Peter King, U.S. representative from Seaford
- George Pataki, governor of New York

=== Polling ===
| Poll source | Date(s) | Sample size | Margin of error | Rudy Giuliani | Peter King | Rick Lazio | George Pataki | Other / undecided (Note: Calculated by taking the difference of 100% and all other candidates combined.) |
|---|---|---|---|---|---|---|---|---|
| Quinnipiac University Polling Institute | June 30, 1999 | – | – | 67% | 6% | 9% | – | 18% |
| Quinnipiac University Polling Institute | May 24, 1999 | – | – | 36% | – | 8% | 45% | 11% |

== General election ==
=== Candidates ===
- John Adefope (Right to Life)
- John Clifton (Libertarian)
- Hillary Rodham Clinton, first lady of the United States (Democratic, Liberal, and Working Families)
- Mark Dunau (Green)
- Jeffrey Graham (Independence)
- Rick Lazio, U.S. representative from Brightwaters (Republican and Conservative)
- Jacob Perasso (Socialist Workers)
- Louis Wein, perennial candidate (Constitution)

=== Polling ===
| Poll source | Date(s) | Sample size | Margin of error | Rick Lazio (R) | Hillary Rodham Clinton (D) | Other / undecided (Note: Calculated by taking the difference of 100% and all other candidates combined.) |
|---|---|---|---|---|---|---|
| Zogby Analytics | November 5, 2000 | 689 | — | 48% | 51% | 1% |
| Marist College | November 4, 2000 | 580 | — | 46% | 50% | 4% |
| Rasmussen Reports | November 4, 2000 | 680 | — | 40% | 48% | 12% |
| Harris Insights & Analytics | November 3, 2000 | 13,590 | — | 46% | 51% | 3% |
| Quinnipiac University Polling Institute | November 3, 2000 | 979 | — | 39% | 51% | 10% |
| Blum & Weprin Associates | November 2, 2000 | 851 | — | 40% | 47% | 13% |
| Zogby Analytics | November 2, 2000 | 700 | — | 45% | 49% | 6% |
| Blum & Weprin Associates | November 1, 2000 | 883 | — | 40% | 47% | 13% |
| SurveyUSA | November 1, 2000 | 500 | — | 45% | 51% | 4% |
| Marist College | October 30, 2000 | 516 | — | 46% | 50% | 4% |
| Princeton Survey Research Associates International | October 30, 2000 | 844 | — | 47% | 48% | 5% |
| Zogby Analytics | October 30, 2000 | 700 | — | 47% | 45% | 8% |
| CBS News/The New York Times | October 27, 2000 | 871 | — | 44% | 52% | 4% |
| Quinnipiac University Polling Institute | October 27, 2000 | 600 (Note: Sample size unavailable; 600 is a default estimate used in the source dataset.) | — | 44% | 47% | 9% |
| Zogby Analytics | October 27, 2000 | 700 | — | 46% | 45% | 9% |
| Blum & Weprin Associates | October 24, 2000 | 850 | — | 43% | 50% | 7% |
| SurveyUSA | October 24, 2000 | 500 | — | 45% | 51% | 4% |
| Rasmussen Reports | October 22, 2000 | 781 | — | 45% | 48% | 7% |
| Zogby Analytics | October 19, 2000 | 504 | — | 43% | 42% | 15% |
| Quinnipiac University Polling Institute | October 6, 2000 | [data missing] | — | 43% | 50% | 7% |
| Quinnipiac University Polling Institute | September 27, 2000 | [data missing] | — | 43% | 50% | 7% |
| Quinnipiac University Polling Institute | September 12, 2000 | [data missing] | — | 44% | 49% | 7% |
| Quinnipiac University Polling Institute | August 9, 2000 | [data missing] | — | 43% | 46% | 11% |
| Zogby International | July 29, 2000 | [data missing] | — | 50% | 42% | 8% |
| Quinnipiac University Polling Institute | July 12, 2000 | [data missing] | — | 45% | 45% | 10% |
| Quinnipiac University Polling Institute | June 7, 2000 | [data missing] | — | 44% | 44% | 12% |
| Quinnipiac University Polling Institute | May 16, 2000 | [data missing] | — | 31% | 50% | 19% |

Hypothetical polling

| Poll source | Date published | Sample size | Margin of error | Rudy Giuliani (R) | Hillary Clinton (D) | Joseph DioGuardi (C) |
|---|---|---|---|---|---|---|
| Quinnipiac | February 3, 1999 | [data missing] | – | 42% | 51% | – |
| Quinnipiac | February 23, 1999 | [data missing] | – | 36% | 54% | – |
| Quinnipiac | March 23, 1999 | [data missing] | – | 39% | 50% | – |
| Quinnipiac | April 15, 1999 | [data missing] | – | 42% | 47% | – |
| Quinnipiac | April 22, 1999 | [data missing] | – | 41% | 49% | – |
| Quinnipiac | May 24, 1999 | [data missing] | – | 42% | 48% | – |
| Quinnipiac | June 30, 1999 | [data missing] | – | 44% | 46% | – |
| Quinnipiac | July 29, 1999 | [data missing] | – | 45% | 45% | – |
| Quinnipiac | September 16, 1999 | [data missing] | – | 44% | 45% | – |
| Quinnipiac | October 5, 1999 | [data missing] | – | 46% | 43% | – |
| Quinnipiac | November 10, 1999 | [data missing] | – | 47% | 42% | – |
| Quinnipiac | December 16, 1999 | [data missing] | – | 46% | 42% | – |
| Quinnipiac | January 20, 2000 | [data missing] | – | 46% | 42% | – |
| Quinnipiac | February 6, 2000 | [data missing] | – | 45% | 42% | – |
| Quinnipiac | March 2, 2000 | [data missing] | – | 48% | 41% | – |
| Quinnipiac | April 5, 2000 | [data missing] | – | 43% | 46% | – |
| Quinnipiac | May 1, 2000 | [data missing] | – | 44% | 46% | – |
| Quinnipiac | May 16, 2000 | [data missing] | – | 41% | 42% | 5% |

Clinton v. Lazio (before Giuliani withdrawal)

| Poll source | Date published | Hillary Clinton (D) | Rick Lazio (R) |
|---|---|---|---|
| Quinnipiac | March 23, 1999 | 56% | 23% |
| Quinnipiac | May 24, 1999 | 52% | 30% |
| Quinnipiac | June 30, 1999 | 50% | 34% |
| Quinnipiac | July 29, 1999 | 50% | 32% |

Clinton v. D'Amato

| Poll source | Date published | Hillary Clinton (D) | Alfonse D'Amato (R) |
|---|---|---|---|
| Quinnipiac | February 23, 1999 | 60% | 30% |
| Quinnipiac | March 23, 1999 | 56% | 34% |
| Quinnipiac | April 15, 1999 | 54% | 34% |
| Quinnipiac | April 22, 1999 | 55% | 36% |

Clinton v. Pataki

| Poll source | Date published | Hillary Clinton (D) | George Pataki (R) |
|---|---|---|---|
| Quinnipiac | May 24, 1999 | 47% | 45% |
| Quinnipiac | May 16, 2000 | 41% | 46% |

Clinton v. King

| Poll source | Date published | Hillary Clinton (D) | Peter King (R) |
|---|---|---|---|
| Quinnipiac | June 30, 1999 | 51% | 31% |
| Quinnipiac | July 29, 1999 | 50% | 30% |

Lowey v. Giuliani

| Poll source | Date published | Nita Lowey (D) | Rudy Giuliani (R) |
|---|---|---|---|
| Quinnipiac | March 23, 1999 | 30% | 48% |

Lowey v. D'Amato

| Poll source | Date published | Nita Lowey (D) | Alfonse D'Amato (R) |
|---|---|---|---|
| Quinnipiac | March 23, 1999 | 39% | 39% |

Lowey v. Lazio

| Poll source | Date published | Nita Lowey (D) | Rick Lazio (R) |
|---|---|---|---|
| Quinnipiac | March 23, 1999 | 33% | 20% |

=== Campaign ===
The contest drew considerable national attention and both candidates were well-funded. By the end of the race, Democrat Clinton and Republicans Lazio and Giuliani had spent a combined $90 million, the most of any U.S. Senate race in history. Lazio outspent Clinton $40 million to $29 million, with Clinton also getting several million dollars in soft money from Democratic organizations. Among Clinton antagonists circles, direct mail-based fundraising groups such as the Emergency Committee to Stop Hillary Rodham Clinton sprung up, sending out solicitations regarding the "carpetbagging" issue.

Clinton secured a broad base of support, including endorsements from conservation groups and organized labor, but notably not the New York City police union which endorsed Lazio while firefighters supported Clinton. While Clinton had a solid base of support in New York City, candidates and observers expected the race to be decided in upstate New York where 45 percent of the state's voters lived. During the campaign, Clinton vowed to improve the economic picture in upstate New York, promising that her plan would deliver 200,000 New York jobs over six years. Her plan included specific tax credits with the purpose of rewarding job creation and encouraging business investment, especially in the high-tech sector. She called for targeted personal tax cuts for college tuition and long-term care. Lazio faced a unique tactical problem campaigning upstate. The major issue there was the persistently weak local economy, which Lazio hoped to link to his opponent's husband's tenure in office. Attacks on the state of the upstate economy were frequently interpreted as criticism of incumbent Republican governor George Pataki, however, limiting the effect of this line of attack.

In July 2000, the release of State of a Union: Inside the Complex Marriage of Bill and Hillary Clinton by author Jerry Oppenheimer led to reports that Clinton had called someone a "fucking Jew bastard" in 1974. The report, which received international media coverage, "rocked" Clinton's campaign, with The Daily Telegraph describing the campaign as having "mounted a frantic damage limitation exercise after details of the alleged incident were leaked". Clinton had reportedly screamed the insult at Paul Fray, who managed Bill Clinton's unsuccessful 1974 congressional campaign. Fray, his wife, and another campaign staffer stated that they had heard Clinton's outburst, while both Clintons adamantly denied that she had referenced Fray's heritage (while Oppenheimer wrote that Fray's father was Jewish, in reality Fray was a Southern Baptist whose closest Jewish ancestor was a paternal great-grandmother). Bill Clinton did allow that Hillary might have simply called Fray a "bastard". In media interviews, Fray and his wife acknowledged several factors that tended to undermine his credibility: he had lost his license to practice law for altering court records; he had made false accusations against the Clintons in the past; and he had suffered a brain hemorrhage with some resultant losses of memory.

Opponents continued to make the carpetbagging issue a focal point throughout the race and during debates. Talk radio hammered on this, with New York-based Sean Hannity issuing a daily mantra, "Name me three things Hillary Clinton has ever done for the people of New York!" Clinton's supporters pointed out that the state was receptive to national leaders, such as Robert F. Kennedy who was elected to the Senate in 1964 despite similar accusations. In the end, according to exit polls conducted in the race, a majority of the voters dismissed the carpetbagging issue as unimportant.

During the campaign, Independent Counsel Robert Ray filed his final reports regarding the long-running Whitewater, "Travelgate", and "Filegate" investigations of the White House, each of which included specific investigations of Hillary Clinton actions. The reports exonerated her on the files matter, said there was insufficient evidence regarding her role in Whitewater, and said that she had made factually false statements regarding the Travel Office firings but there was insufficient evidence to prosecute her. Although The New York Times editorialized that the release of the reports seemed possibly timed to coincide with the Senate election, in practice the findings were not seen as likely to sway many voters' opinions.

A September 13, 2000 debate between Lazio and Clinton proved important. Lazio was on the warpath against soft money and the amounts of it coming from the Democratic National Committee into Clinton's campaign, and challenged Clinton to agree to ban soft money from both campaigns. He left his podium and waved his proposed paper agreement in Clinton's face; many debate viewers thought he had invaded her personal space and as a result Clinton's support among women voters solidified.

Late in the campaign, Lazio criticized Clinton for accepting campaign donations from various Arab groups in the wake of the USS Cole bombing. The Lazio campaign orchestrated a wave of telephone calls to voters using this attack. This issue caused former New York Mayor Ed Koch to take out ads telling Lazio to "stop with the sleaze already," and did not change the dynamic of the race. Some of Lazio's campaign strategists would later say that the Cole-based attack had backfired and became the campaign's biggest blunder.

=== Results ===
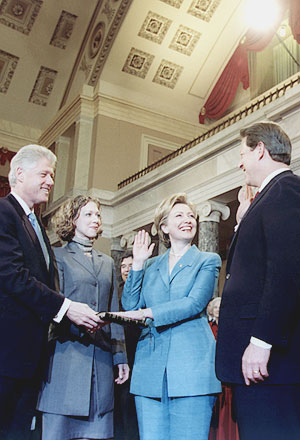
Having won the election, Clinton is sworn in as the junior senator from New York, January 3, 2001.

2000 United States Senate election results
| Party | Candidate | Votes | % | ±% |
|---|---|---|---|---|
| Democratic | Hillary Rodham Clinton | 3,562,415 | 52.54% | −0.24 |
| Working Families | Hillary Rodham Clinton | 102,094 | 1.51% | N/A |
| Liberal | Hillary Rodham Clinton | 82,801 | 1.22% | −1.25 |
| total | Hillary Rodham Clinton | 3,747,310 | 55.27% | +0.02 |
| Republican | Rick Lazio | 2,724,589 | 40.19% | +4.46 |
| Conservative | Rick Lazio | 191,141 | 2.82% | −2.95 |
| total | Rick Lazio | 2,915,730 | 43.01% | +1.50 |
| Independence | Jeffrey Graham | 43,181 | 0.64% | +0.08 |
| Green | Mark Dunau | 40,991 | 0.60% | N/A |
| Right to Life | John Adefope | 21,439 | 0.32% | −1.68 |
| Libertarian | John Clifton | 4,734 | 0.07% | −0.31 |
| Constitution | Louis Wein | 3,414 | 0.05% | N/A |
| Socialist Workers | Jacob Perasso | 3,040 | 0.04% | −0.27 |
| Majority | | 831,580 | 12.27% | |
| Turnout | | 6,779,839 | 100.00% | |
| Democratic hold | | | | |

==== By county ====
| County | Hillary Clinton Democratic | | Rick Lazio Republican | | All others | | Margin | | Total votes cast |
| County | # | % | # | % | # | % | # | % | Total votes cast |
|---|---|---|---|---|---|---|---|---|---|
| Albany | 81,867 | 57.9% | 56,485 | 39.9% | 3,039 | 2.1% | 25,382 | 18.0% | 141,391 |
| Allegany | 6,364 | 35.3% | 11,255 | 62.4% | 415 | 2.3% | -4,891 | -27.1% | 18,034 |
| Bronx | 261,378 | 84.9% | 44,078 | 14.3% | 2,419 | 0.8% | 217,300 | 70.6% | 307,875 |
| Broome | 41,819 | 48.3% | 42,760 | 49.4% | 2,046 | 2.4% | -941 | -1.1% | 86,625 |
| Cattaraugus | 13,955 | 41.8% | 18,539 | 55.5% | 881 | 2.6% | -4,584 | -13.7% | 33,375 |
| Cayuga | 16,931 | 50.0% | 16,203 | 47.9% | 722 | 2.1% | 728 | 2.1% | 33,856 |
| Chautauqua | 25,787 | 44.4% | 31,184 | 53.7% | 1,113 | 1.9% | -5,397 | -9.3% | 58,084 |
| Chemung | 16,419 | 43.9% | 20,381 | 54.5% | 572 | 1.6% | -3,962 | -10.6% | 37,372 |
| Chenango | 8,546 | 42.4% | 11,110 | 55.1% | 502 | 2.6% | -2,564 | -12.7% | 20,158 |
| Clinton | 14,343 | 47.4% | 15,185 | 50.2% | 703 | 2.3% | -842 | -2.8% | 30,231 |
| Columbia | 12,685 | 44.8% | 14,859 | 52.4% | 789 | 2.8% | -2,174 | -7.6% | 28,333 |
| Cortland | 9,472 | 45.9% | 10,736 | 52.0% | 427 | 2.1% | -1,264 | -6.1% | 20,365 |
| Delaware | 7,918 | 39.7% | 11,523 | 57.8% | 511 | 2.5% | -3,605 | -18.1% | 19,952 |
| Dutchess | 46,658 | 41.3% | 62,393 | 56.5% | 2,450 | 2.2% | -16,735 | -15.2% | 110,501 |
| Erie | 237,770 | 56.1% | 177,168 | 41.8% | 8,543 | 2.0% | 60,602 | 14.3% | 423,481 |
| Essex | 7,222 | 40.8% | 10,012 | 56.5% | 474 | 2.6% | -2,790 | -15.7% | 17,708 |
| Franklin | 8,665 | 50.3% | 8,229 | 47.7% | 341 | 2.0% | 436 | 2.6% | 17,235 |
| Fulton | 8,739 | 40.7% | 12,322 | 57.4% | 399 | 1.8% | -3,583 | -16.7% | 21,460 |
| Genesee | 9,947 | 38.6% | 15,198 | 59.0% | 620 | 2.4% | -5,251 | -20.4% | 25,765 |
| Greene | 7,821 | 37.3% | 12,621 | 60.2% | 522 | 2.5% | -4,800 | -22.9% | 20,964 |
| Hamilton | 1,119 | 30.6% | 2,474 | 67.7% | 60 | 1.6% | -1,355 | -37.1% | 3,653 |
| Herkimer | 12,007 | 43.7% | 14,880 | 54.1% | 616 | 2.2% | -2,873 | -10.4% | 27,503 |
| Jefferson | 16,044 | 44.4% | 17,121 | 47.4% | 2,972 | 8.3% | -1,077 | -3.0% | 36,137 |
| Kings | 467,699 | 76.0% | 140,788 | 22.9% | 6,780 | 1.1% | 326,911 | 53.1% | 615,267 |
| Lewis | 4,040 | 37.4% | 6,058 | 56.1% | 707 | 6.6% | -2,018 | -18.7% | 10,805 |
| Livingston | 10,186 | 38.1% | 15,925 | 59.6% | 626 | 2.3% | -5,739 | -21.5% | 26,737 |
| Madison | 11,689 | 41.5% | 15,837 | 56.2% | 639 | 2.2% | -4,148 | -14.7% | 28,165 |
| Monroe | 152,603 | 48.3% | 157,820 | 49.9% | 5,549 | 1.7% | -5,217 | -1.6% | 315,972 |
| Montgomery | 9,742 | 47.5% | 10,357 | 50.6% | 389 | 1.9% | -615 | -3.1% | 20,488 |
| Nassau | 263,962 | 45.1% | 312,252 | 53.4% | 8,547 | 1.5% | -48,290 | -8.3% | 584,671 |
| New York | 433,599 | 77.2% | 119,263 | 21.2% | 8,970 | 1.6% | 314,336 | 56.0% | 561,832 |
| Niagara | 47,356 | 51.2% | 43,432 | 46.9% | 1,789 | 1.9% | 3,924 | 4.3% | 92,577 |
| Oneida | 41,138 | 43.0% | 52,431 | 54.8% | 2,055 | 2.2% | -11,293 | -11.8% | 95,624 |
| Onondaga | 106,796 | 52.6% | 92,132 | 45.4% | 3,915 | 2.0% | 14,664 | 7.2% | 202,843 |
| Ontario | 18,753 | 41.1% | 25,905 | 56.8% | 930 | 2.1% | -7,152 | -15.7% | 45,588 |
| Orange | 48,515 | 38.7% | 74,328 | 59.3% | 2,433 | 1.9% | -25,813 | -20.6% | 125,276 |
| Orleans | 6,194 | 39.4% | 9,285 | 59.0% | 260 | 1.6% | -3,091 | -19.6% | 15,739 |
| Oswego | 23,080 | 48.0% | 23,921 | 49.8% | 1,062 | 2.2% | -841 | -1.8% | 48,063 |
| Otsego | 11,079 | 44.2% | 13,309 | 53.1% | 692 | 2.8% | -2,230 | -8.9% | 25,080 |
| Putnam | 15,024 | 35.6% | 26,384 | 62.5% | 807 | 1.9% | -11,360 | -26.9% | 42,215 |
| Queens | 384,457 | 69.6% | 162,747 | 29.4% | 5,513 | 1.0% | 221,710 | 40.2% | 552,717 |
| Rensselaer | 33,287 | 49.0% | 33,056 | 48.7% | 1,602 | 2.4% | 231 | 0.3% | 67,945 |
| Richmond | 57,816 | 41.0% | 81,584 | 57.9% | 1,579 | 1.1% | -23,768 | -16.9% | 140,979 |
| Rockland | 56,340 | 46.2% | 63,983 | 52.4% | 1,693 | 1.4% | -7,643 | -6.2% | 122,016 |
| Saratoga | 41,165 | 43.7% | 51,106 | 54.3% | 1,835 | 1.9% | -9,941 | -10.6% | 94,106 |
| Schenectady | 32,800 | 49.4% | 32,271 | 48.7% | 1,260 | 1.9% | 529 | 0.7% | 66,331 |
| Schoharie | 5,303 | 39.5% | 7,825 | 58.3% | 293 | 2.2% | -2,522 | -18.8% | 13,421 |
| Schuyler | 3,247 | 40.2% | 4,644 | 57.5% | 190 | 2.4% | -1,397 | -17.3% | 8,081 |
| Seneca | 6,693 | 46.8% | 7,297 | 51.1% | 297 | 2.1% | -604 | -4.3% | 14,287 |
| St. Lawrence | 20,864 | 52.6% | 16,887 | 42.6% | 1,897 | 4.8% | 3,977 | 10.0% | 39,648 |
| Steuben | 14,124 | 35.5% | 24,896 | 62.5% | 812 | 2.0% | -10,772 | -27.0% | 39,832 |
| Suffolk | 234,418 | 41.1% | 326,230 | 57.2% | 9,739 | 1.7% | -91,812 | 16.1% | 570,387 |
| Sullivan | 12,813 | 45.4% | 14,723 | 52.2% | 671 | 2.5% | -1,910 | -6.8% | 28,207 |
| Tioga | 8,579 | 38.5% | 13,282 | 59.6% | 425 | 1.9% | -4,703 | -21.1% | 22,286 |
| Tompkins | 22,672 | 57.2% | 15,699 | 39.6% | 1,264 | 3.1% | 6,973 | 17.6% | 39,635 |
| Ulster | 35,682 | 46.3% | 39,249 | 50.7% | 2,295 | 2.9% | -3,387 | -4.4% | 77,406 |
| Warren | 11,105 | 39.4% | 16,530 | 58.7% | 545 | 1.9% | -5,425 | -19.3% | 28,180 |
| Washington | 9,183 | 39.1% | 13,483 | 57.5% | 793 | 3.4% | -4,300 | -18.4% | 23,459 |
| Wayne | 14,527 | 38.2% | 22,717 | 59.7% | 789 | 2.1% | -8,190 | -21.5% | 38,033 |
| Westchester | 188,038 | 51.1% | 174,533 | 47.4% | 5,461 | 1.6% | 13,505 | 3.7% | 368,032 |
| Wyoming | 6,134 | 35.0% | 10,914 | 62.3% | 467 | 2.7% | -4,780 | -27.3% | 17,515 |
| Yates | 3,952 | 39.3% | 5,931 | 58.9% | 183 | 1.8% | -1,979 | -19.6% | 10,066 |
| Totals | 3,747,310 | 55.3% | 2,915,730 | 43.0% | 116,799 | 1.7% | 831,580 | 12.3% | 6,779,839 |

Counties that flipped from Democratic to Republican

- Broome (largest municipality: Binghamton)
- Chautauqua (County Seat: Mayville)
- Chemung (largest municipality: Elmira)
- Clinton (largest municipality: Plattsburgh)
- Jefferson (largest municipality: Le Ray)
- Monroe (largest municipality: Rochester)
- Nassau (largest municipality: Hempstead)
- Rockland (County Seat: New City)
- Richmond (Staten Island, borough of New York City)

Counties that flipped from Republican to Democratic

- Cayuga (County Seat: Auburn)
- Rensselaer (County Seat: Troy)

== Aftermath ==
=== Hasidic pardons ===
In January 2001, two months after Hillary Clinton's election to the Senate, President Bill Clinton pardoned four residents of the New Square Hasidic enclave in Rockland County, New York, who had been convicted of defrauding the federal government of $30 million by establishing a fictitious religious school. New Square had voted almost unanimously for Clinton in the New York Senate race. A lawyer following the matter stated that even if Clinton had promised to lobby her husband for clemency in exchange for the town's votes — a claim for which there was no proof — it would be difficult to establish a crime had taken place: "Politicians make promises all the time. That's nothing new — or illegal." Clinton acknowledged sitting in on a post-election meeting discussing possible clemency for the four, but said she had played no part in her husband's decision.

A federal investigation launched to investigate various Clinton pardons, closed its investigation of the New Square matter in June 2002 by taking no action against Bill, Hillary Clinton, or any residents of New Square.

=== Hollywood fundraiser ===
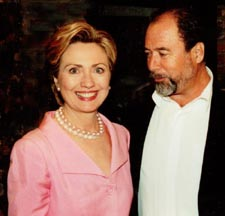
Hillary Clinton with her largest 2000 contributor, Peter Paul, at the Gala Hollywood Farewell Salute to President Clinton.

Hillary Clinton's former finance director, David Rosen, was indicted on January 7, 2005, on campaign finance charges related to a fundraising event produced by Peter F. Paul. Paul, a convicted drug dealer who would soon after be convicted on stock fraud charges after being extradited from Brazil, stated that he spent $1.2 million to produce the August 12, 2000 Hollywood Gala Salute to President William Jefferson Clinton event, which was both a tribute to honor President Clinton and a fundraiser for the First Lady's 2000 Senate campaign. The Justice Department indictment charged Rosen with filing false reports with the Federal Election Commission by reporting only $400,000 in contributions. On May 27, 2005, the jury acquitted Rosen on all counts. On January 5, 2006, it was reported that Clinton's campaign group agreed to pay a $35,000 fine related to the underreporting of the fundraiser's expenses.

Peter Paul also filed a civil suit in this matter, Paul v. Clinton. On April 10, 2006, the judge in charge of the case removed Hillary Clinton as a defendant, citing a lack of evidence, but leaving open the possibility that she might still be called to testify as a witness in the case. The removal was upheld by the California Second District Court of Appeal on October 16, 2007.

Meanwhile, by the time of Hillary Clinton's 2008 presidential campaign, a 13-minute video produced by Paul and describing his various allegations against Hillary Clinton had become quite popular on the Internet, gaining 1.4 million hits on Google Video and about 350,000 on YouTube in a single week in October 2007.

=== Analysis ===
Clinton won the election on November 7 with 55 percent of the vote to Lazio's 43 percent, a difference larger than most observers had expected. Clinton won the traditionally Democratic base of New York City by large margins, and carried suburban Westchester County, but lost heavily populated Long Island, part of which Lazio represented in Congress. She won 13 of 61 counties, with surprising victories in Upstate counties, such as Cayuga, Rensselaer, and Niagara. Overall, she lost Upstate to Lazio by only 3 percentage points, to which her win has been attributed.

In comparison with other results, Clinton's 12-point margin was smaller than Gore's 25-point margin over Bush in the concurrent presidential contest within the state; was slightly larger than the 10-point margin by which fellow New York senator Chuck Schumer defeated incumbent Republican Al D'Amato in the hotly contested 1998 senate race; and was considerably smaller than the 47-point margin by which Senator Schumer won reelection in 2004 senate race against little-known Republican challenger Howard Mills. The victory of a Democrat in the Senate election was not assured, because in recent decades the Republicans had won about half the elections for governor and senator.

Lazio's bid was handicapped by the weak performance of George W. Bush in New York in the 2000 election, but it was also clear Hillary Clinton had made substantial inroads in upstate New York prior to Lazio's entry into the race. Exit polls also showed a large gender gap with Clinton running stronger than expected among moderate women and unaffiliated women. Clinton's victory would establish her as an effective campaigner and an electoral force on her own, able to capture Republican and independent votes and overcome her polarizing image. She would easily win re-election in 2006, and in 2007 began her presidential campaign for 2008.

Lazio gave up his House seat to run for Senate. Following his defeat, which set a record for the most money spent in a losing Senate effort, he took positions in the corporate world and avoided electoral politics until becoming a candidate in New York's 2010 gubernatorial election. However, he was defeated by a wide margin in the Republican primary.

Giuliani would undergo treatment for his cancer and eventually recover; he would also divorce Donna Hanover and eventually marry Judith Nathan. After his campaign withdrawal, his political future looked uncertain at best. But less than a year after the Senate general election, the September 11 attacks took place, with Giuliani still mayor. Giuliani's performance in the aftermath of September 11 earned him many accolades and resurrected his political prospects. After a successful stint in the private sector, in 2007 he also began his presidential campaign for 2008.

Throughout much of 2007, Clinton and Giuliani led in national polls for their parties' respective nominations, and media reports often looked back to the 2000 "race that wasn't" as a preview of what might lie in wait for the entire nation in 2008. Such extrapolating ended with the Giuliani campaign's precipitous decline and January 2008 withdrawal. Clinton as well failed to gain the 2008 nomination and, in June 2008, she finished in a close second place to Illinois senator Barack Obama.

In December 2008, Lowey would have another chance at the Senate seat, when Clinton was nominated for U.S. Secretary of State by President-elect Obama and Lowey was considered a front-runner to be named as her appointed replacement. But Lowey withdrew from consideration, as in the intervening years she had gained enough seniority to become one of the powerful "cardinals" on the House Appropriations Committee and did not want to relinquish that position. When Caroline Kennedy announced her interest in the vacancy, comparisons were drawn to Clinton in 2000, with both being famous people seeking to hold elective office for the first time. Others pointed out that Clinton had won election to the office while Kennedy would first be appointed. In any case, Kennedy's effort soon faltered, in part due to not having the same desire or willingness to work for the seat as Clinton had had, and she soon withdrew as abruptly as she had entered.

Kirsten Gillibrand received the appointment, and attention then turned to who would run against her in the 2010 Senate special election. By November 2009, Giuliani was seriously considering a run for his old would-have-been Senate seat, but the following month he announced he was not running for it or anything else in 2010, signalling an end to his political career.

Giuliani and Clinton got another chance to battle each other during the 2016 U.S. presidential election, when she was the Democratic nominee and he was one of the few high-profile Republicans to enthusiastically campaign for that party's nominee, Donald Trump. As The Washington Post wrote, "Rudy Giuliani is finally running the race against Hillary Clinton that he first contemplated some 17 years ago: a brutish bout under a white-hot spotlight." His actions on behalf of Trump included not only fiery attacks on Clinton's record as Secretary of State but also charges that she was experiencing significant problems with her health. A Clinton spokesperson responded by pointing out that it was Giuliani who had left the 2000 senatorial race in part for health reasons, not Clinton. Giuliani said Clinton was "too stupid to be president" for having stayed married to her husband following the Lewinsky scandal. Clinton sent some mild barbs Giuliani's way during the Alfred E. Smith Memorial Foundation Dinner in October 2016, to which Giuliani responded to with stone-faced silence rather than the usual playing-along mirth. The former mayor also issued a false charge against Clinton's statements regarding her role following the September 11 attacks that he had to apologize for. And in the days leading up to the election, Giuliani implied, and then denied, that he had had inside knowledge of the FBI's late-in-the-campaign reopening of its investigation into the Clinton emails matter. Following Clinton's loss, Giuliani was considered to be on Trump's short list for both Attorney General – if picked, he said he would be open to prosecuting Clinton – and Clinton's past job of Secretary of State – where his potential conflicts from his post-mayoral consulting work, advisor roles, and paid speeches for foreign clients and corporations could have exposed him to some of the same charges that he had made against Clinton when she had held that position. In the event, he was not selected for either position.

The attacks continued; in March 2018 Giuliani made a joke at a fundraiser at Trump's Mar-a-Lago resort, the premise of which was that Clinton was almost too fat to fit through doorways. Judith Giuliani was reported to have given her husband a "most foul look" following the remark; the Giulianis announced they were getting divorced a few weeks later. News of the breakup caused media outlets to recall how the Rudy-Judith relationship had all first come to light during the hectic weeks of the 2000 senatorial campaign.

== See also ==
- 2000 United States Senate elections
