= Nelson Thall =

Nelson Spencer Thall (born November 7, 1952) is a media scientist and Marshall McLuhan scholar most noted for his portrayal of media commentator Lenny Bloom. Thall is a member of one of the Five Families that controls the Toronto Star newspaper. One of the last graduate students of McLuhan, Thall produced and hosted the Corus Entertainment series Cloak & Dagger discussing the effects of media with guests such as Alex Jones, David Icke, and Andreas von Bülow. During the last two years of the show on Corus and later via online streaming radio, Lenny Bloom was joined by Chicago-based activist Sherman Skolnick.

As a former Director and Chief Archivist of the McLuhan Center On Global Communications Thall, in 1991, was the recipient of the Marshall McLuhan Distinguished Teachers Award and on May 7, 1996, represented the Writers Guild of Canada before the Canadian Artists and Producers Professional Relations Tribunal, writing the legal definition of terms such as 'multimedia' into law. Also in 1996, Bill Gates requested his contribution to 'Web-Weaving : Intranets, Extranets and Strategic Alliances' by Paula Boyle and economist and author Peter Lloyd where he updated the definition of The Global Village. From 1997 to 2002 he served on the Board of Directors of Torstar.

On December 30, 1999, Thall joined the board of directors of Stan Lee Media.

In April 2004, Toronto police entered Thall's residence without a search warrant thus contravening his rights as granted under the Canadian constitution. This illegal entry by police occurred only weeks after Cloak & Dagger Radio Show on AM640 broadcast live interviews with police informants who exposed internal police union corruption. Thall was arrested but never convicted, bail money and items seized returned to him by police. The break-in by police was reported in the newspaper. His lawyer, Edward Greenspan, claimed that his client was harassed as a result of his work on radio.
