= Gala Hollywood Farewell Salute to President Clinton =

Dinner and concert in 2000

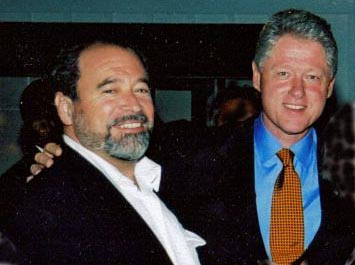
President Bill Clinton (right) with Gala host Peter Paul (2000)

The Hollywood Gala Salute to President William Jefferson Clinton took place on August 12, 2000 (two days before the start of the 2000 DNC) at the private Brentwood, California estate of businessman Ken Roberts.

The event included both a dinner and a concert, and about 350 people accepted invitations to both. The singers during the concert included Michael Bolton, Cher, Toni Braxton, Patti LaBelle, Sugar Ray, and Diana Ross. Celebrities in attendance included John Travolta, Brad Pitt, Jennifer Aniston, Jason Alexander, and Muhammad Ali and his wife Lonnie Ali. White House daughter Chelsea Clinton was also present for the event.

The political committee New York Senate 2000 failed to file proper documentation for the event with the Federal Election Commission, and later paid $35,000 in fines.

Shortly after the party, it was revealed that organizer Peter Paul had a criminal conviction for drug dealing, leading Hillary Clinton to distance herself from him. Three other men involved with the gala have also since been convicted of federal felonies. Co-organizer Aaron Tonken was sentenced to 63 months in jail for committing fraud connected with charity fund raising. Sponsor Raymond Reggie was convicted of bank fraud and served time in jail. Finally, a man named James Levin, who claimed to have been paid to "monitor" the party for Clinton pleaded guilty to a contracting fraud scheme involving the Chicago Public Schools.

== See also ==
- Hollywood fundraiser controversy
- Paul v. Clinton
