= FortuneCity =

Defunct US free webhosting service

- Founder: 1997
- Headquarters: New York City, New York, United States
- Area served: Webhosting

FortuneCity was a webhosting service based in New York City. The service was founded in 1997 by Richard Jones and Dan Metcalfe, two British entrepreneurs. Jay Metcalfe was the company's main shareholder and its chairman. It had one million users.

It collaborated with Warner Brothers to create a community called AcmeCity, which allowed users to create a web site using WB characters, logos, etc. without infringing on copyright.

When FortuneCity first came online, it offered a free web hosting account with 6 MB of disk space. Later, they increased the space to 10 MB, 20 MB and then 100 MB. However, since upgrading to 100 MB, the original virtual community design has been removed; the "virtual map" of each district is gone, the division of district is also gone, but the community, mayor and district ministers remain.

The company went public in March 1998. It was oversubscribed 37 times after its initial offering. FortuneCity receives its revenue mostly from advertisements.

FortuneCity began as a free web hosting service, but they have announced that after April 30, 2012, they would no longer be providing free web space, citing increasing costs as the reason. At this point, it was also rebranded as Dotster.
