= Stan Lee Media =

Defunct media company

Stan Lee Media, Inc.
- Type: Public
- Traded as: Nasdaq: SLEE
- Industry: Entertainment
- Founded: October 1998; 28 years ago
- Founder: Stan Lee, Peter F. Paul
- Defunct: December 19, 2000
- Fate: Bankruptcy
- Headquarters: Beverly Hills, California, US
- Services: internet and motion picture animation studio
- Subsidiaries: Stan Lee Media Studios

Stan Lee Media, Inc. (SLM) was an Internet-based creation, production and marketing company that was founded in 1998, filed for Chapter 11 bankruptcy protection in 2000, and ultimately dismissed from bankruptcy in November 2006. In its early years, the company created Stan Lee branded super hero franchises for applications in all media including the standout series the 7th Portal. Its 165-man animation production studio was based in Los Angeles from 1998 to 2001. It won the 2000 Web Award for the best Entertainment Portal on the World Wide Web, but the company failed in the same year. Stan Lee himself cut ties with the company long before his death.

== History ==
The company was founded by Stan Lee (co-creator of the characters Spider-Man, X-Men, Iron Man, The Hulk, and Fantastic Four) with his then-friend, Peter F. Paul in 1998 as Stan Lee Entertainment. Stan Lee Entertainment merged with Stan Lee Media, Inc. (SLM) of Delaware in April 1999. In July 1999, SLM of Delaware acquired Boulder Capital Opportunities, Inc., a publicly traded company, in a reverse merger structured by investment banker Stan Medley, and through this reverse merger Stan Lee Media became a publicly traded company under the symbol SLEE.

The company won the Best of Show Web Award in November 2000, as the best Entertainment Portal on the internet, beating Warner Bros' and Disney's portals.

The company launched the first new team of superheroes to be created by Stan Lee in thirty years, The 7th Portal, at a $1 million gala hosted by Dick Clark at Raleigh Studios on February 29, 2000. The first high concept 'webisode' to be broadcast on the internet, The 7th Portal's worldwide debut crashed the servers of Macromedia's Shockwave website, with millions of would-be viewers trying to access it.

The President of Sony Digital studios was hired away to become the CEO of Stan Lee Media in June 2000, and a joint venture with the largest anime manga company in Japan resulted in production and distribution deals over the internet, on television and in theme parks in Europe, South America and Asia.

SLM used $4.3 million in stock to purchase Conan Properties Inc., owner of Conan the Barbarian. Plans for a third Conan movie and webisodes were made. Meanwhile, with the SLM stock price falling below the sale agreement level, a legal battle ensued with the previous owners, Baums, LSDC, Arthur Lieberman and the de Camps.

=== Bankruptcy ===
The company ran out of operating capital during the dot-com meltdown and closed operations entirely by December 19, 2000.

Near the end of 2000, investigators began a review of stock transactions by co-founder Peter Paul and corporate officer Stephan Gordon. Paul fled to São Paulo, Brazil to avoid prosecution, and the company filed for Chapter 11 bankruptcy protection on February 11, 2001. Paul was extradited back to the U.S. after the US Attorney in New York indicted him for violating SEC Rule 10b-5, a securities regulation felony. Paul pleaded guilty. He was sentenced to ten years in jail, and was incarcerated in October 2009.

During the Chapter 11 debtor in possession proceedings, Stan Lee assigned the major character franchises he created to his new public company, POW! Entertainment, without the knowledge or approval of the Bankruptcy court. Courts later determined that Lee and his new partner Arthur Lieberman failed to disclose the existence and value of the Rights Assignment that Lee made to the company when he founded it.

=== Lawsuits ===
Various parties, including some connected to co-founder Peter Paul, sought to take control of Stan Lee Media Inc of Colorado (SLMI), a successor company to Stan Lee Media, and to sue Stan Lee, Marvel Entertainment, and other parties, for intellectual property owned by Lee, his later company POW! Entertainment, or Marvel Comics, claiming that this property belonged in fact to Stan Lee Media Inc of Colorado. For clarity below, Stan Lee Media Inc of Colorado is referred to as SLMI, as opposed to the original Stan Lee Media, which is referred to as SLM.

In January 2007, Lee sued SLMI and Jim Nesfield, who was then running the company, claiming the company was committing $50 million worth of trademark infringement.

On March 15, 2007, Nesfield, representing shareholders of SLMI, filed a lawsuit in New York against Marvel Entertainment for $5 billion, claiming that Stan Lee's assignment of all of his creative rights to SLM made SLMI a co-owner of the characters that Lee created for Marvel.

On April 7, 2007, pursuant to a Resolution of the board of directors of Stan Lee Media Inc. of Colorado, John Petrovitz was elected to the board of directors of SLMI and appointed President of Stan Lee Media Studios, Worldwide. On June 9, 2007, Peter Paul and his associates filed suit against POW! Entertainment, Stan Lee, and other former executives of SLM, accusing them of improperly transferring assets from SLM's bankruptcy to start POW! Entertainment in November 2001 without the knowledge of the Bankruptcy Court or creditors of SLM. In July, they filed suit in California. On July 27, 2007, Stan Lee Media Studios, Inc. was formed in Delaware.

In September 2008, Nesfield's suit from March 2007 was dismissed without prejudice. It would be replaced by a largely similar suit, again in New York, in January 2009.

On January 20, 2009, Martin Garbus held a press conference in New York announcing a new suit against Marvel Entertainment, Inc., in which he represented Nelson Thall and John Petrovitz against Marvel Enterprises, Inc., Marvel Characters, Joan Lee (Stan Lee's wife), Joan C. Lee (Stan Lee's daughter), Isaac Perlmutter (Marvel executive), Avi Arad (Marvel executive) and Arthur M. Lieberman (Marvel executive) for recovering more than $750,000,000 in profits owed by Marvel to Stan Lee Media since 1998. In the press conference Garbus explained his theory that Stan Lee retained an interest in his early characters by virtue of having been a 'co-creator' of those characters, and that he had assigned these to SLM in an October 15, 1998 agreement. Garbus believed that Marvel's claim to the characters rested on a similar agreement signed a month later, by which time Lee had nothing left to assign (having already given the characters to Stan Lee Media). Garbus believed that high levels of compensation paid to Stan Lee by Marvel after a 2005 lawsuit indicated that Marvel acknowledged Stan Lee's co-creator status, and that this acknowledgment probably appeared in the settlement agreement between the two (the agreement was sealed by the court).

On January 27, Judge Stephen Wilson ruled that Lee and POW! Entertainment had illegally transferred the rights to the characters The Drifter, The Accuser and Stan's Evil Clone from SLM, without the knowledge or consent of the Bankruptcy Court. On March 17, A Colorado court gave a victory to Stan Lee, denying efforts by P.F.P. Family Holdings, a company affiliated with Peter Paul, to reconvene the December 2008 SLMI shareholder meeting. The plaintiffs had hoped to use the meeting to install themselves or their allies as directors of SLMI, but the court determined that there had been no quorum and thus no meeting to reconvene.

In September 2009, Garbus, complaining of "irreconcilable differences with his clients" was replaced as lead counsel by Oliver Armas at Chadbourne & Parke, and the new firm sought to amend Garbus's original complaint.

On March 31, 2010, Judge Paul Crotty dismissed the New York lawsuit against Marvel, Stan Lee, and others, citing lack of standing, expiration of the statute of limitations, and other causes. Crotty ruled that a "lifetime" agreement Lee had signed violated California labor law. On May 27, the Colorado Court of Appeals issued an order to reverse the Colorado Court decision of March 17, 2009, having determined that a sufficient number of shares were represented at the 2008 board of directors meeting to establish a quorum and elect the board of directors. On September 15, Raymond J. Dowd moved to substitute SLMI as the real party of interest and filed a "Memorandum of Law in Reply and Further Support for Motion to Unseal and Motion to Substitute" in United States District Court Southern District of New York.

In 2011, investor Michael Wolk organized a group to finance SLMI's legal actions against Walt Disney. His primary investor was Elliott Management. SLMI hired new counsel, who petitioned Judge Wilson to lift his stay on the California proceedings. This was granted, and they filed a new, consolidated complaint in February 2011. They sought a jury trial over the question of whether or not they actually owned the characters that Lee had created. Hearings were scheduled for March 8, 2012.

On August 21, 2011, the day Conan the Barbarian opened, SLMI sued Paradox Entertainment, Conan Sales Co., Arthur Lieberman and others over the rights to the character Conan, as they claim Conan was improperly transferred to Conan Sales Co. and sold to Paradox. On February 9, 2012, Judge Stephen Wilson dismissed all of SLMI's claims.

By 2012, the proceedings in California courts were placed on hold until the New York suits were decided (to be placed permanently on hold if the New York court affirmed the matters were res judicata). On March 21, the New York court tossed out SLMI's claims but without deciding res judicata, thus allowing proceedings against Stan Lee in California to proceed. SLMI brought suit in California the next day, but the suit was dismissed by U.S. federal judge Stephen Wilson. SLMI filed a notice of appeal on September 21, 2012.

On October 10, 2012, SLMI sued The Walt Disney Company (the current owner of Marvel) in Colorado for billions of dollars over the rights to the Marvel characters, claiming that Stan Lee assigned the rights for his characters to Marvel, and that Disney never publicly recorded Marvel's agreement with Lee with the U.S. Copyright Office. In motions to dismiss the lawsuit, Disney called the suit "frivolous" and "a wholly improper attempt to revive a claim already rejected three times." As quoted in Forbes, Wolk responded that prior legal efforts by some shareholders of Stan Lee Media to pursue ownership rights of the superhero characters were stymied because the claims were brought by minority shareholders who were trying to stand in the shoes of the company without its authorization. But after wresting control of Stan Lee Media, Wolk claimed he would be able to pursue infringement claims directly for the first time.

In September 2013, Judge William Martinez dismissed SLMI's Colorado suit as a retread of previous failed efforts, writing "Plaintiff has tried time and again to claim ownership of those copyrights; the litigation history arising out of the 1998 Agreement stretches over more than a decade and at least six courts... Taking its cue from the Southern District of New York and the Central District of California, this Court holds that Plaintiff is precluded from re-litigating the issue of its ownership of copyrights based on the 1998 Agreement..." The judge held that SLMI owned no valid copyright, and disallowed their further amending their claims. Disney then sued SLMI for almost $500,000 in legal fees, of which they were granted $239,941.

SLMI appealed the decision against them in the Colorado case (which appeal, if effective, would have also cancelled the $239,941 costs judgment against them), and sold a license to the Marvel character Spider-Man to the American Musical Theater for use in their show Broadway: Now & Forever. Disney had already sued American Musical Theater, and expanded their legal actions to include SLMI as well. In December 2013, SLMI sued for a declaratory judgment that SLMI "is the owner of the copyrights and trademarks regarding Spider-Man." In October 2014, SLMI suffered two legal defeats, as a suit they had brought in the Ninth Circuit against Stan Lee himself was discarded as "simply implausible," and their attempt to intervene in the Disney/American Musical Theater suit was barred by U.S. District Judge Jeffrey Schmehl, who wrote "These issues have previously been addressed in one form or another by multiple courts around the country." In December 2014, the Tenth Circuit concurred with the October decision by the Ninth Circuit, reviewing the dispute de novo and refusing to revive SLMI's suit against Disney.

In March 2015, the U.S. Supreme Court declined to hear SLMI's appeal of the Ninth Circuit decision. In July 2015, SLMI was ordered to pay Disney nearly $82,000 in legal fees in respect of its failed Tenth Circuit claims, and an additional $140,000 in respect of its claims regarding American Music Theater before the Eastern District of Pennsylvania.

As of February 2016, all of the courts' judgements for SLMI to pay for various legal fees equaled nearly half a million dollars, and SLMI's bank accounts were nearly empty.

In January 2020, Stan Lee's daughter, JC Lee, attempted to take ownership of the intellectual property supposedly owned by Stan Lee Media by suing POW! Entertainment. POW! Entertainment's lawyer, Chaz Rainey argued that JC's complaint was “so fatally flawed that it is difficult to decide where to begin.” In June, Judge Otis Wright dismissed the suit with prejudice (meaning it could not be refiled), and fined JC Lee $1,000,000 for bringing a frivolous suit. The judge wrote "The Court finds it completely unreasonable to file a suit premised on an issue debated and analyzed in more than five federal district courts over the last decade."

== Productions ==
Some of Stan Lee Media's most important projects included the animated Web series The 7th Portal (where Stan Lee himself voiced the character Izayus), The Drifter, and The Accuser. The 7th Portal characters were licensed to an interactive 3D movie attraction in four Paramount theme parks.

=== The 7th Portal ===
The 7th Portal became the first ever web animation series to succeed as a 3D ride attraction and to be developed for a $150 million movie by Paramount with producer Mark Canton.

The first public use of the word Webisode has been attributed to the marketing and promotion of The 7th Portal. It is a portmanteau formed by the words 'web' and 'episode'.

The 7th Portal premiered on the new animation hub Shockwave, on February 29, 2000, when its global launch overwhelmed Macromedia's servers. It became the most successful web originated animated series, being picked up by Fox in mid run, for distribution on TV in South America and Europe. Twenty-two episodes were made, of which the first twenty were shown on-line before the website went bankrupt. The final two episodes were only visible on television. All 22 episodes are on YouTube.

=== Others ===
Other productions included the Evil Clone (a cartoon parodying modern media), the StanLeeMedia.net website, and The Backstreet Project, a project including the Backstreet Boys. Different editions on The Backstreet Project comic books were released on the market. Six webisodes were also released in 1999 via StanLeeMedia.net. Stan's Evil Clone was often voiced by Stan's friend Jim Salicrup.
